= Iquitos =

City in Loreto, Peru

Iquitos San Pablo de Nuevo Napeanos
- City
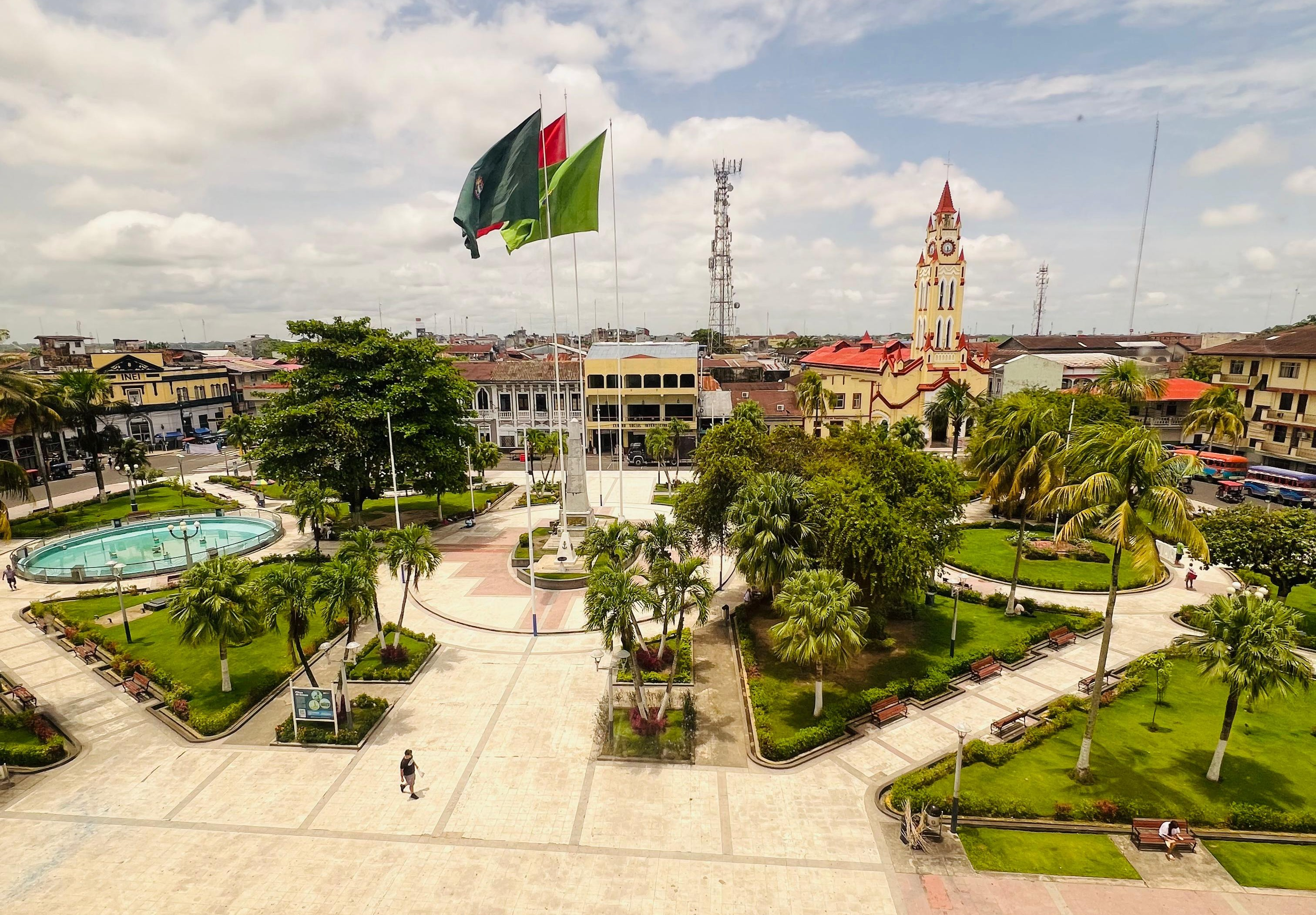
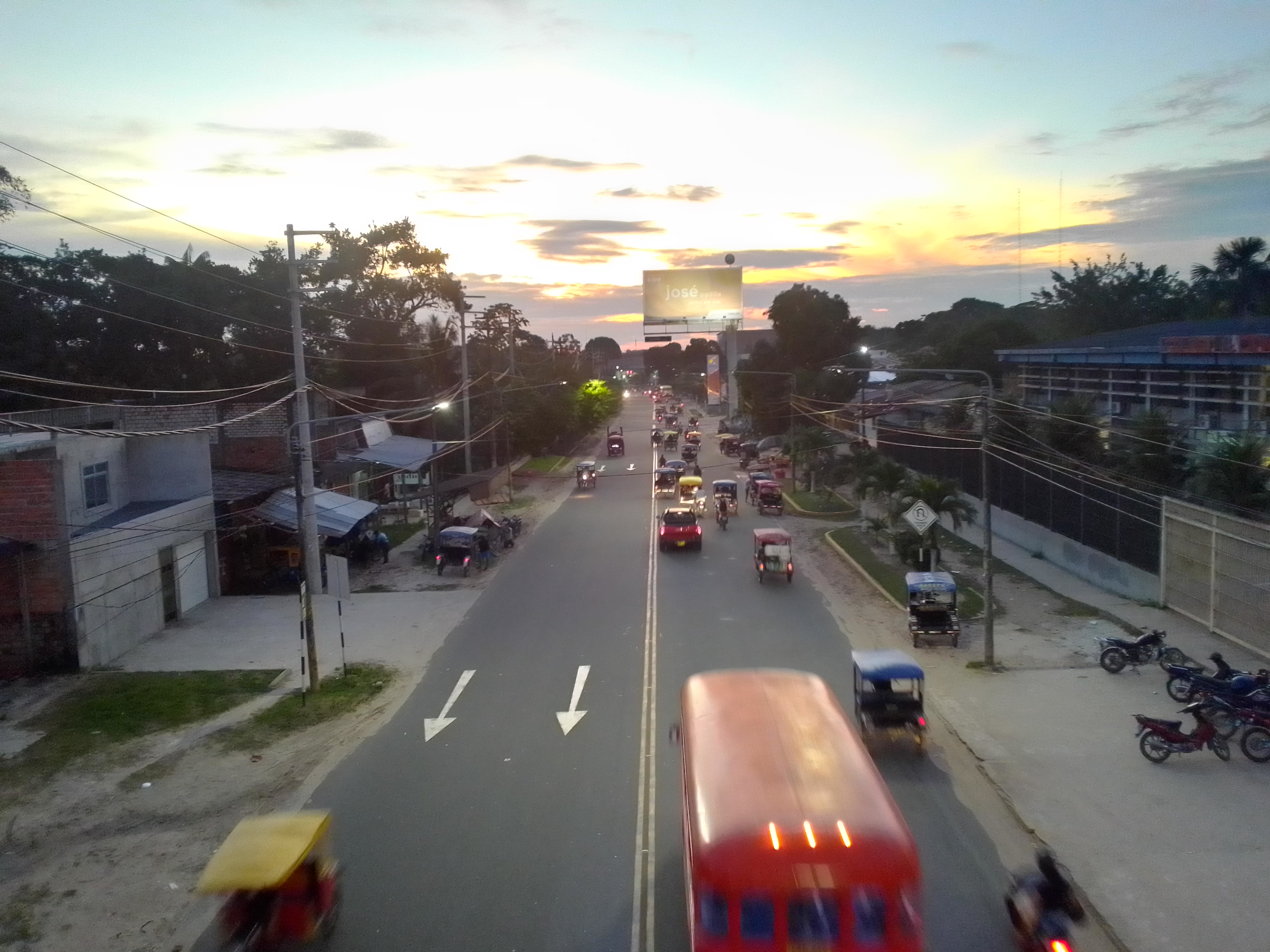
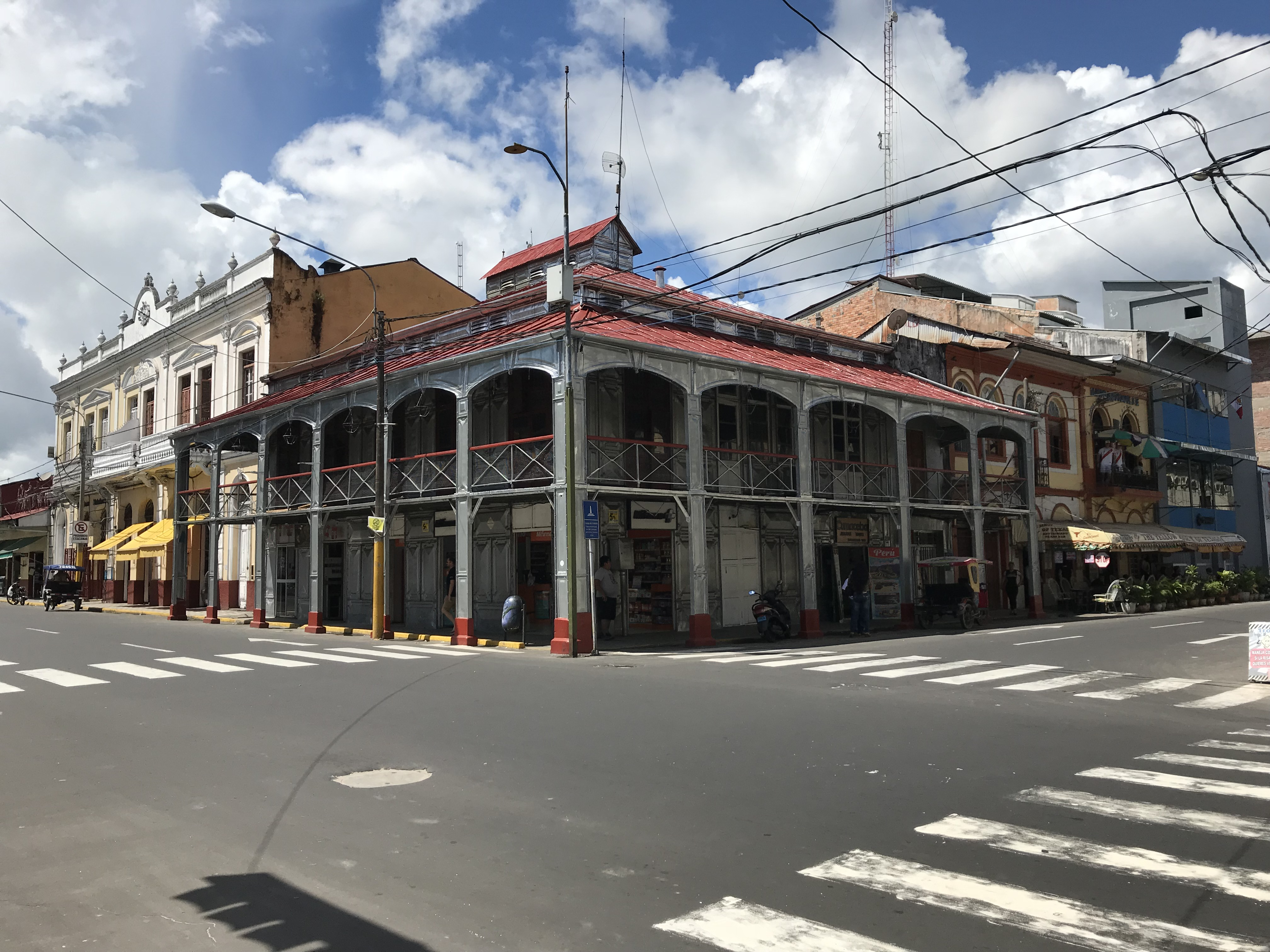
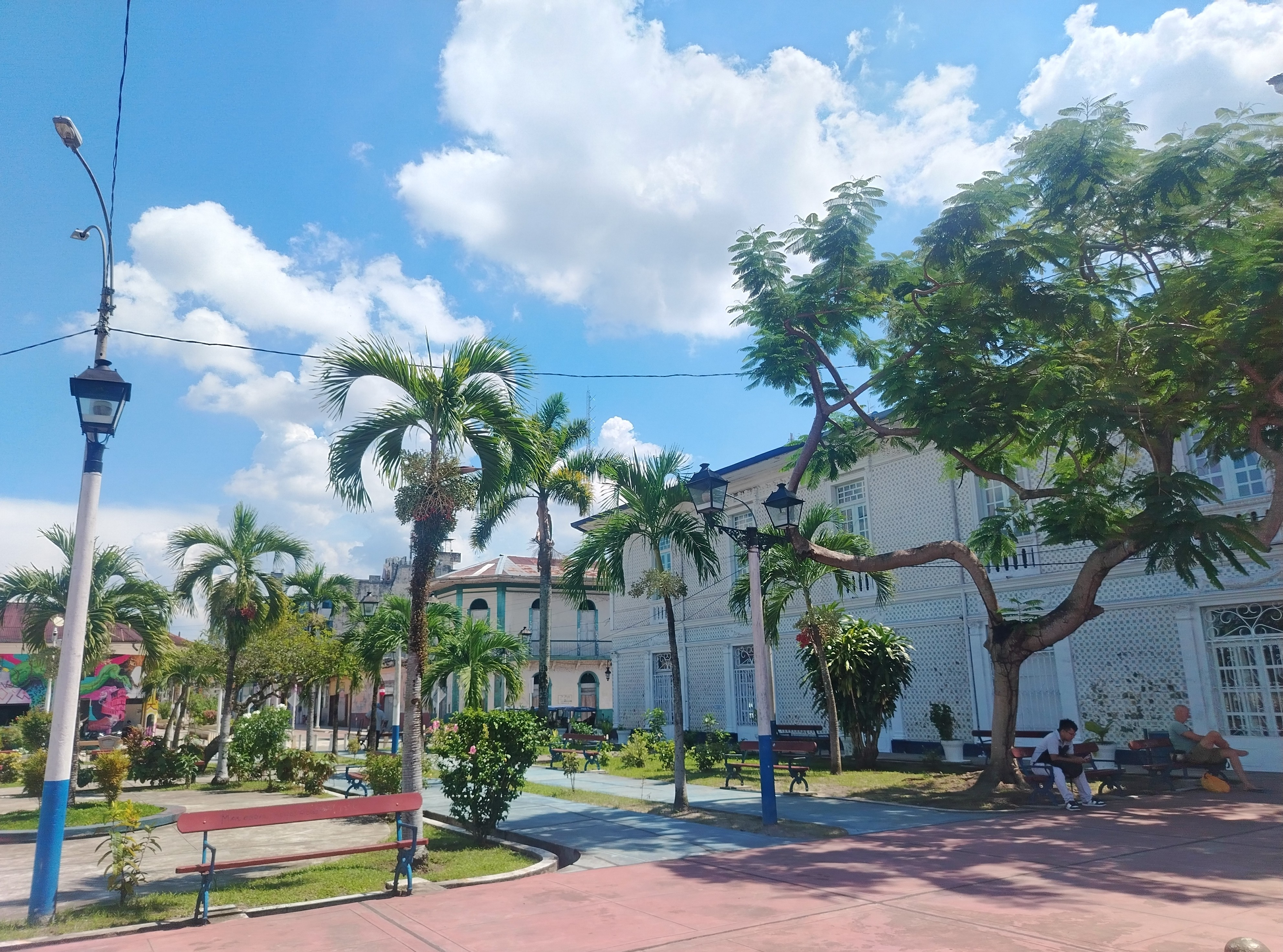
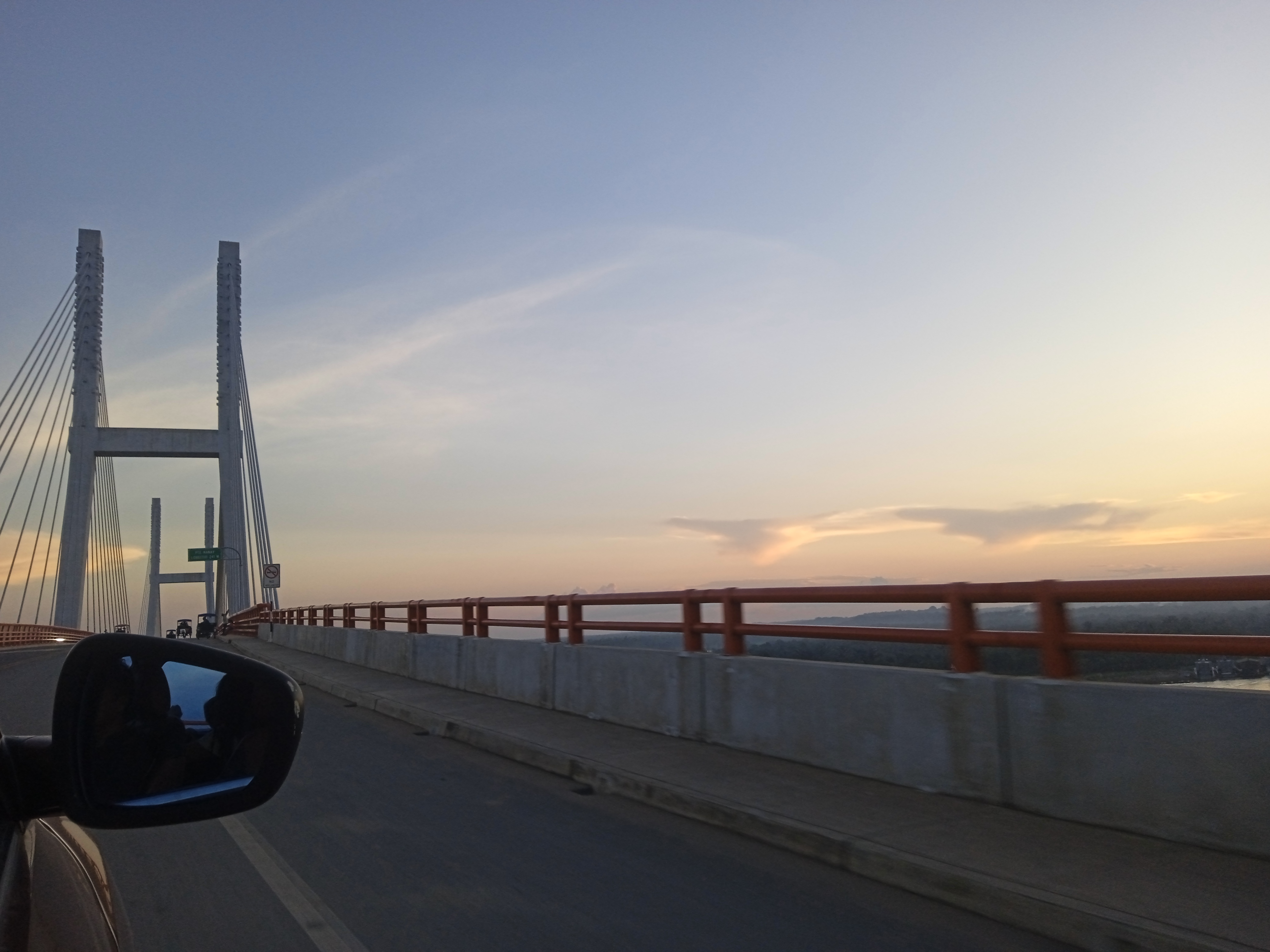
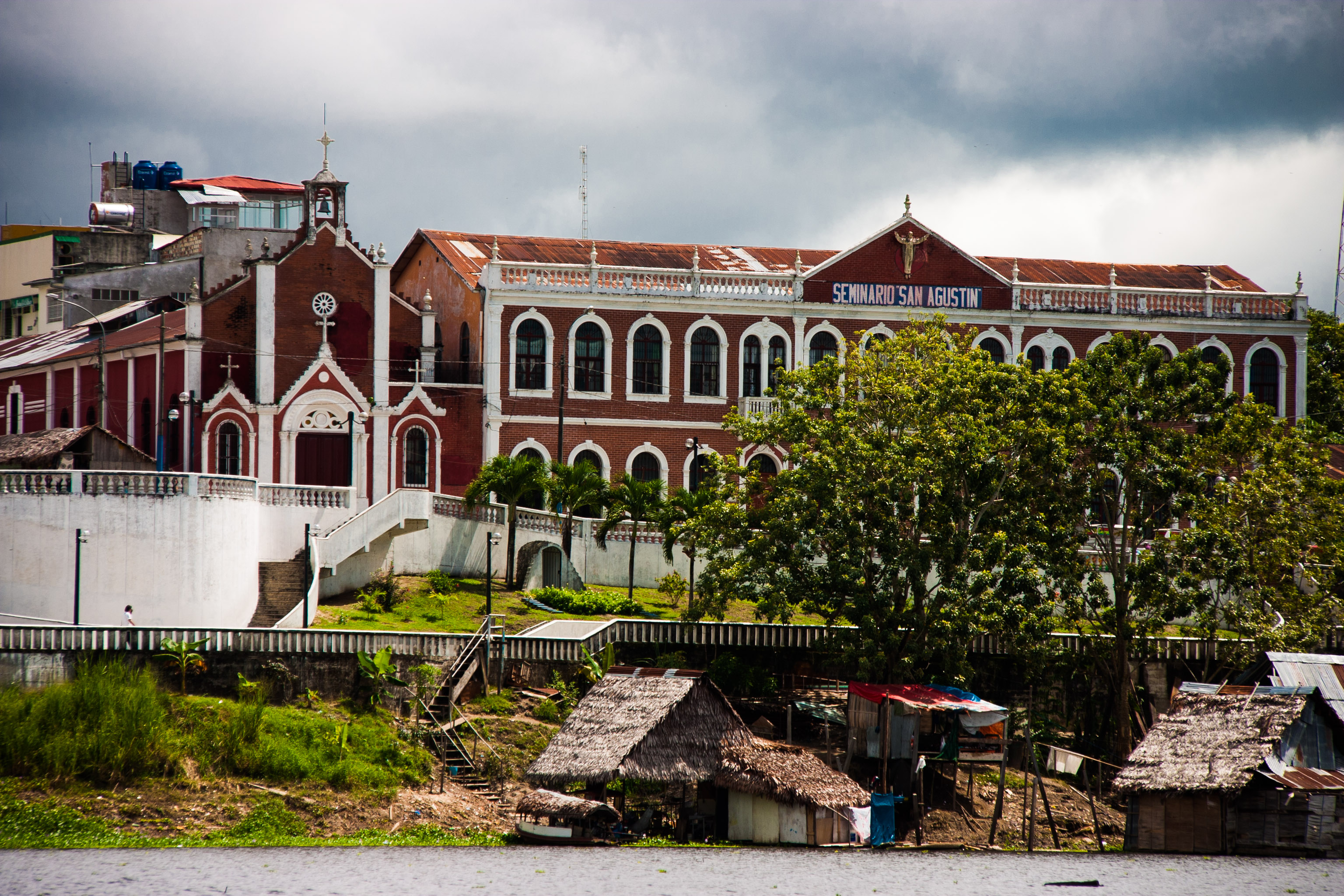
- From top to bottom and from left to right: Iquitos Cathedral; José Abelardo Quiñones Avenue; Casa de Fierro; Plazuela Ramón Castilla; Nanay Bridge; Chapel of Consolation and Saint Augustine Seminary.

- Flag Coat of arms
- Nicknames: Capital of the Peruvian Amazon, The Amazonian Island
- Motto: Carpent tua poma nepotes (Latin: Your children will harvest your fruits)
- Location within the Loreto Region in Peru Iquitos (Peru) Iquitos (South America)
- Coordinates: 3°45′S 73°15′W
- Country: Peru
- Region: Loreto
- Province: Maynas
- District: Iquitos
- Settled: 1624
- Incorporated: 1866

Government
  - Type: Local government
  - Body: Provincial Municipality of Maynas
  - Mayor: Francisco Sanjurjo Dávila (2019–2022)

Area
  - City: 1,213 km^{2} (468.5 sq mi)
  - Land: 784 km^{2} (302.6 sq mi)
  - Water: 340 km^{2} (132 sq mi)
- Elevation: 104 m (341 ft)

Population
  - Estimate (2023): 491,000
  - Rank: 9th
  - Metro: 510,000
- Demonym: Iquiteño
- Time zone: UTC-5 (PET)
- UBIGEO: 1601
- Area code: 65
- ISO 3166 code: PE-LOR
- Climate: Af
- Website: www.munimaynas.gob.pe

Iquitos (/ɪˈkɪtɒs, iː-, -toʊs/; Spanish pronunciation: [iˈkitos]) is the capital city of Peru's Maynas Province and Loreto Region. It is the largest metropolis in the Peruvian Amazon, east of the Andes, as well as the ninth-most populous city in Peru. Iquitos is the largest city in the world that cannot be reached by road that is not on an island; it is only accessible by river and air.

It is known as the "capital of the Peruvian Amazon". The city is located in the Great Plains of the Amazon Basin, fed by the Amazon, Nanay, and Itaya rivers. Overall, it constitutes the Iquitos metropolitan area, a conurbation of 471,993 inhabitants consisting of four districts: Iquitos, Punchana, Belén, and San Juan Bautista.

The area has long been inhabited by indigenous peoples. According to Spanish historical documents, Iquitos was established around 1757 as a Spanish Jesuit reduction on the banks of the Nanay River. The Jesuits gathered local Napeano (Yameo) and Iquito natives to live here, and they named it San Pablo de Napeanos.

In the late 19th century, during the Amazon rubber boom, the city became the center of export of rubber production from the Amazon Basin and was the headquarters of the Peruvian Amazon Company (PAC). The city's economy was highly dependent on the PAC, controlled by Peruvian businessman Julio César Arana. The PAC kept indigenous workers in near slavery conditions through use of force and harsh treatment, until an investigation caused a reaction against the company. In addition, rubber seedlings had been smuggled out of the country and cultivated on plantations in Southeast Asia, undercutting prices of the Peruvian product. With the decline of the rubber industry, many workers and merchants left Iquitos.

As one of the leading cities, along with Manaus, during the Amazon rubber boom (1880–1914), Iquitos was influenced by the numerous Europeans who flocked to it. Architecture and cultural institutions established during this period expressed their own traditions. An opera house and Jewish cemetery were among the institutions established.

Later in the 20th century, the city and region diversified its economy. The region exported timber, fish and its by-products, oil, minerals, and agricultural crops. It also derives revenue from tourism and related crafts. In 1999, the city consolidated its four municipalities.

== History ==
=== Early period ===
The area was inhabited for thousands of years by Amerindians. At the time of European encounter, the Napeano and Iquito peoples occupied the area. They had small seasonal settlements and were nomadic hunter-gatherers, living in close association with the rivers. The city name of Iquitos is derived from a group of native people called Iquitos by the Spaniards. They had previously inhabited areas along the rivers Pastaza, Arabela, Tigre, Nanay, and Curaray. Eventually, the native Iquito migrated to the area around the rivers Nanay, Amazonas, Itaya, and the Lake Moronacocha.

Between 1638 and 1769, the Iquitos and other native tribes of the Marañon rivers were obliged to settle down in various Missions (known as reducciones or reductions) founded and run by Jesuit missionaries from the Audiencia of Quito. The Jesuits settled in the major cities of the Audiencia of Quito, which was part of the Viceroyalty of New Granada at the time. During this period of nearly 130 years, 161 Jesuit missionaries worked to convert and educate the natives of the Amazon region. Among them were 63 criollos (white ethnic Spanish colonists born in the Audencia), 43 Spaniards, 32 Germans and Dutch, 20 Italians, 2 Portuguese, and 1 Frenchman. Their role in South America was to convert the natives of the Amazon Basin to Christianity. The Jesuits successfully gathered the natives living along the Marañon river into various Jesuit missions, where they were set to work at farming and other pursuits.

Commencing in 1730, the Jesuits took 37 years to found the Iquitos missions along the Marañon River, close to the mouth of the Napo and Amazon rivers. These were collectively known as Iquitos Missions, since all these settlements were mainly populated chiefly by the Iquitos natives of the region. The naming and foundation of all the Iquitos Missions were done by Jesuit Father José Bahamonde. He was born in Quito on 1 January 1710, accepted into the Jesuit order, and served as a missionary for decades. After Charles III of Spain suppressed and expelled the Society of Jesus from South America in 1767, Bahamonde was exiled to Italy, where he died in Ravenna, Italy on 11 May 1786.

The following is a chronological list of noted Iquitos Missions founded by Bahamonde and other Jesuits:

1. 1730, Santa Maria de la Luz de los Iquitos "town," founded by Father Bahamonde – as recorded in the Archives of the Indies in Spain.
2. 1740, Juan Nepomuceno de Iquitos, founded by Father Bahamonde
3. 1741, Santa Bárbara de Iquitos, founded by Father Bahamonde
4. 1742, San Sebastián de Iquitos, founded by fathers Bahamonde and Bretano
5. 1748, Sagrado Corazón de Jesús de Maracanos (de Iquitos), founded by Father Bahamonde
6. 1754, Santa María de Iquitos, founded by Father Uriarte
7. 1757, San Pablo de los Napeanos, founded by Father Bahamonde
8. 1763 San Javier de Iquitos, founded by Father Palme
9. 1767 San José de Iquitos, founded by Father Uriarte. Later that year the Jesuits were expelled from South America by order of Charles III.

During the Spanish Colonial era, most of the Jesuit missions were under the jurisdiction of the Royal Audiencia of Quito. Created in 1563, it was a part of the Viceroyalty of Peru, and was transferred briefly to the Viceroyalty of New Granada on 27 May 1717 known as the Cedula Real of 1717 (Royal Decree of 1717). Six and a half years later, on 5 November 1723, Philip V of Spain dissolved the Viceroyalty of New Granada and reincorporated the Audiencia of Quito into the Viceroyalty of Peru. Sixteen years later Philip V of Spain decided to re-create the Viceroyalty of New Granada and to re incorporate the Audiencia of Quito through the Cedula Real (Royal Decree) dated 20 August 1739. Charles III of Spain suppressed the Society of Jesus, believing them too powerful, and expelled them from South America by order dated 20 August 1767. Given the distance from Quito and the lack of roads connecting to that city, a political vacuum was developed in the area. The undefended Jesuit missions were attacked by the Brazilian Bandeirantes. In response the King of Spain on recommendation of Francisco Raquena created the Government and Commandancy General of Maynas in 1802 to halt the invasion into the Spanish Amazon of land-hungry mestizo Portuguese Bandeirantes. In general, this amounted to the religious administration and military command of all tributaries of the Amazon river in the Amazon Basin that belonged to the Royal Audiencia of Quito in the Viceroyalty of New Granada being transferred again to the Viceroyalty of Peru. The Portuguese advance was halted at Tabatinga.

=== 19th century: independence ===
In the early 19th century, following independence, Peru, Ecuador, Colombia, and Brazil had overlapping claims to the Northwestern Amazon Basin, based on each country's interpretation of their colonial de jure titles. The disputed area was populated mostly by groups of nomadic Amerindian natives living in the Amazon jungle. In addition there were semi-assimilated sedentary Amerindians living with a handful of whites and mestizos, dedicated to trading in sparsely populated trading port villages that were found scattered along the river banks of the Amazon Basin. During the colonial era the disputed area known as Maynas had numerous missions administered by the Jesuits of Quito. After the Jesuits were expelled from South America, only a handful of missions survived in the 19th century as isolated trading villages. The Brazilians, by contrast, had a chain of villages along the Amazon River that stretched to its ports along the Atlantic Ocean.

Because Peru discovered that Ecuador and Colombia neglected to effectively control their Amazonian territories during their colonial era, Peru decided to back its de jure titles with de facto possession by setting up military posts in the relatively isolated trading villages and then flooding the disputed area with Peruvian colonists. The only problem lay with the expanding ambitions of Brazil, since it had slowly settled its part of the disputed area with colonists throughout its colonial era; it had a trading relationship with the Spanish-speaking trading posts and villages along the Marañon River. To neutralize Brazil from impeding Peru's planned colonization project, on 23 October 1851, Peru peacefully settled its disputes with Brazil and both countries agreed to a bilateral free navigation and friendly trade along the Amazon River.

As a result of the Peruvian-Brazilian treaty, the Peruvian President Ramon Castilla created the Military and Political Department of Loreto on 7 January 1861 from the former Maynas territory. Castilla ordered that a fluvial port be constructed in a strategic spot on the Amazon River. After some debate, his staff chose the trading port Village of Iquitos. On 5 January 1864, three steamships of the Peruvian Navy: Pastaza, Próspero y Morona, arrived in the Village of Iquitos.

This date is marked as the founding of the first fluvial Peruvian port of Iquitos by the government of Peru. A dockyard and navy factorage imported from England was immediately constructed. In time Iquitos grew so much that it was designated as the capital of the Department of Loreto on 9 November 1897. Iquitos also became the seat of a Roman Catholic Apostolic vicariate. Peru was able to map out and assume de facto control of the majority of the area of the Amazon region under dispute with Ecuador and Colombia. After many skirmishes with Ecuadorian and Colombian outposts, that at times led to war, Peru settled its border with Colombia in 1922 and with Ecuador in 1942.

=== Rubber boom in the 20th century ===
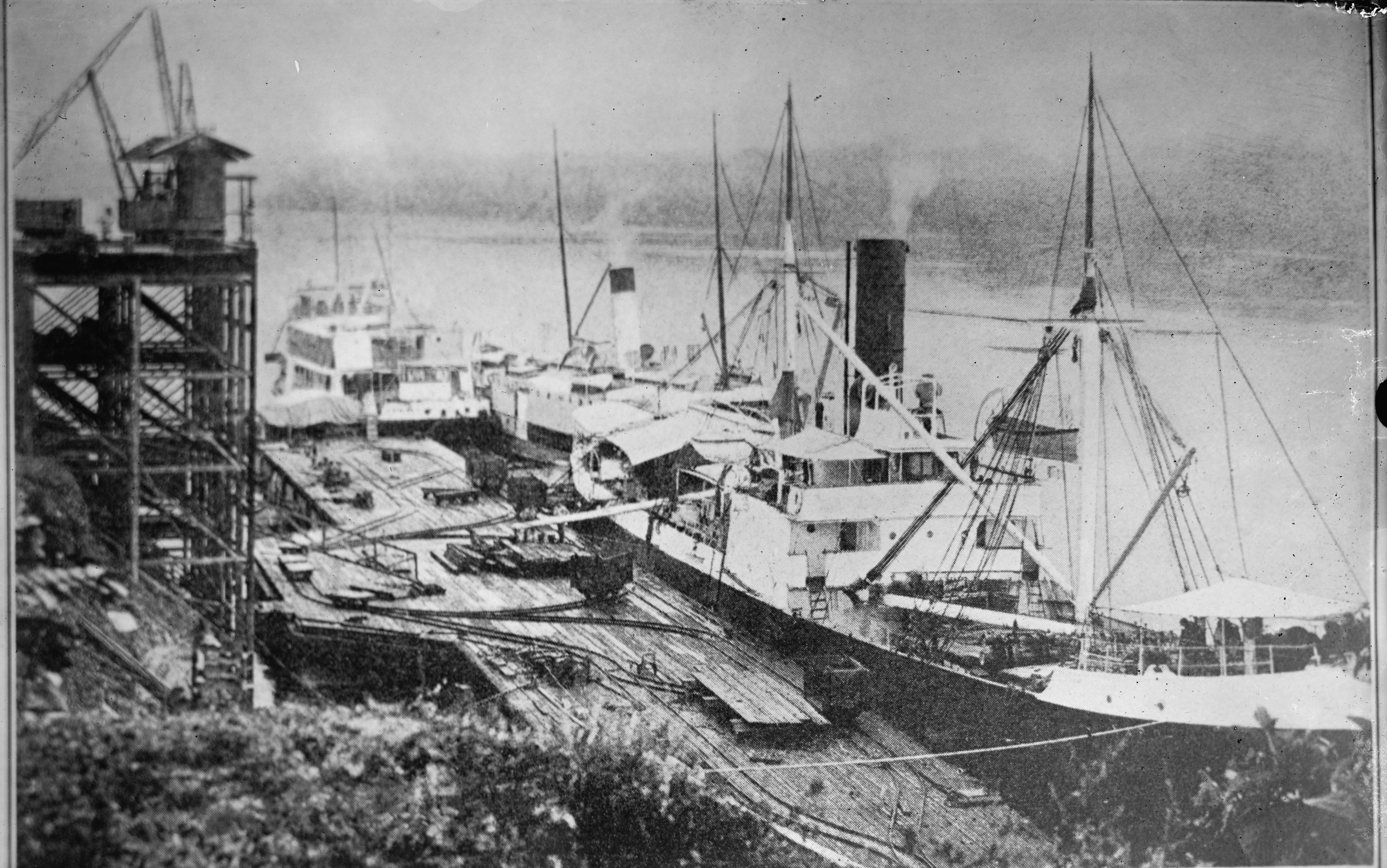
The Booth pier at Iquitos c. 1912

Beginning in the 1900s, Iquitos became wealthy through its rubber industry throughout the rubber boom; it attracted thousands of immigrants from around the world, mostly young single men who hoped to make their fortunes in rubber. The rise of the automobile and related industries had dramatically increased the worldwide demand for rubber. Some men became merchants and bankers, and made their fortunes that way. Many of the European men married indigenous women and stayed in Iquitos the rest of their lives, founding ethnically mixed families. The immigrants brought European clothing styles, music, architecture and other cultural elements to Iquitos. They established an opera house that featured European classical music.

There were twenty-five different commercial houses dealing with rubber at Iquitos in the year 1900. These enterprises were founded by influential citizens of the city, some of the most prominent of these people include Julio César Arana, Cecilio Hernández, as well as Luis and Adolfo Morey. The rubber baron Carlos Fitzcarrald was also active in the city of Iquitos until he drowned in a steamship accident on the Urubamba River in 1897. Rubber entrepreneurs participated in regional politics, and directly as well as indirectly funded the development of the city. A number of successful rubber entrepreneurs held political offices, or had influence over politics in the city during this era. In 1901, Luis F. Morey became a senator for the department of Loreto, which Iquitos was the capital of. Enrique A. Llosa, who had a business relationship with Arana and Luis Morey, became the mayor of Iquitos in 1901. The following year, Arana became the city's mayor, and in 1903 he assumed the office of President for Loreto's chamber of commerce. Cecilio Hernández was also elected as the mayor, later in 1906. A census conducted in 1903 by Bentio Lores, the subprefect of the Bajo Amazonas at the time, documented that there were 9,438 inhabitants in Iquitos.

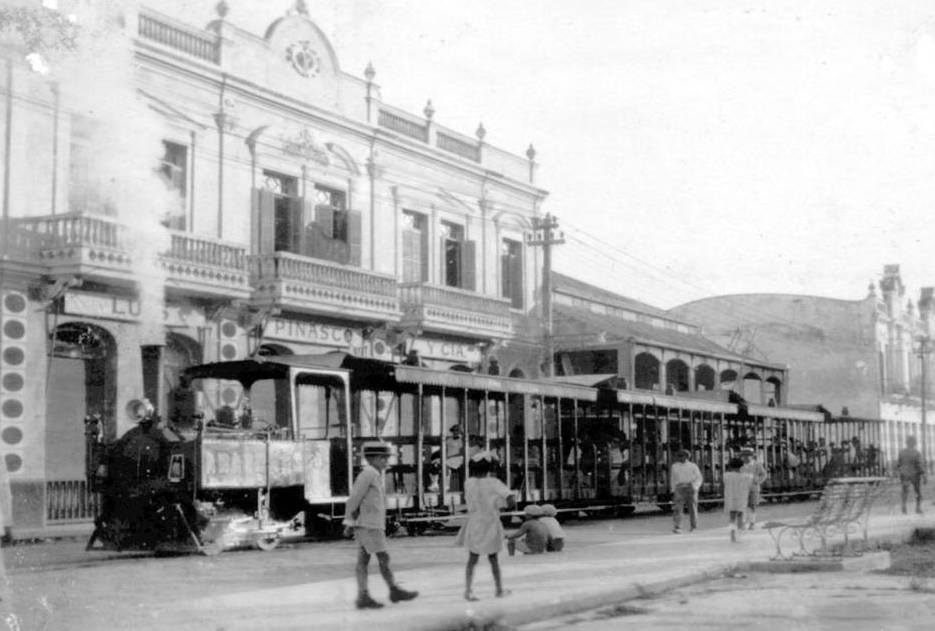
Decauville Locomotive in the early 1900s

In 1908, Hildebrando Fuentes, Prefect of Loreto between 1904–1906, published Loreto: Apuntes geográficos, históricos, esdisticos, politicos y sociales which was based on information he collected while in Iquitos. According to Cristóbal Cardemil-Krause, Fuentes writings "make clear the existence of significant tensions between national and private interests. Entrepreneurs in Loreto controlled the area and appeared to create a state within the state, limiting the effects of Fuentes's decisions." Fuentes also described the practice of Correrias which were slave raids carried out by rubber tappers that resulted in the killing of many indigenous people. Men and older indigenous women were typically killed by the rubber tappers, while children and young females were brought to rubber camps or nearby cities, including Iquitos. The captive children and young females were typically sold at these cities. Fuentes referred to these correrias as "the great crime of the mountain" and in regards to his inability to act against the rubber tappers, he claimed that "[t]hey do all this significantly beyond the reach of authority.". Fuentes wrote that the majority of the indigenous servants at Iquitos consisted of indigenous people captured during correrias, and at times these people were sold in Iquitos for a price ranging between £30 and £50. Walter Ernest Hardenburg, an American engineer that had a prominent role in exposing the Putumayo genocide, also claimed that indigenous people were trafficked in Iquitos and sold in that city for prices ranging between £20 and £40.

In an effort to discourage human trafficking from Loreto to the Brazilian Amazon, government commissioner Joaquin Capello issued a decree in 1900 that required employers to provide a bond for any of their workers that were leaving Peru. This bond was initially set at 200 Peruvian soles and had the intention of attracting employers to transport their workers back into the country once their contracts expired. The bond amount was later increased by Capello's successors. In 1903, subprefect Benito Lores denounced the continuance of human trafficking in Loreto, he stated that instances of human trafficking were covered up under the pretense of transferring debts from one employer to another. Lores claimed that many of the wealthy residents of Iquitos were transporting indigenous peons and transferring their debts to patrons on rivers in Brazil. Once under the custody of their new Brazilian patrons, these indigenous people were interred deep into the forest, far away from the influence of governmental authorities, "where there is no law other than the whip or the bullet." Members of the local business class denied these allegations of trafficking reported by Lores: and in 1904 several rubber merchants signed a petition addressed to the new Prefect Hildebrando Fuentes which demanded the annulment of Capello's decree from 1900. These merchants argued that the decree was unconstitutional due to it prohibiting the free movement of people. Another argument was that instead of benefitting the affected peons, the decree worsened their situation since patrons charged the bail amount against the peons debt. The petition suggested that local authorities and representatives from the chamber of commerce should establish legislation to regulate the removal of peons from the country.

The wealthiest Europeans built great mansions in the late 19th century, some of which survive. Casa de Fierro (Spanish for the Iron House) is said to have been designed by Gustave Eiffel, designer of the Eiffel Tower in Paris, but evidence supporting this claim is scant. After a Briton, Henry Wickham, smuggled rubber seeds out of the area to establish competing rubber plantations in British colonies in southeast Asia and Africa, the boom came to an end. In addition, a 1913 investigative report by Roger Casement, the British consul-general to Iquitos who had investigated labor conditions for natives in the Congo Free State when it was under King Leopold's control, revealed the abuses committed against indigenous workers in the Putumayo River Basin by the Peruvian Amazon Company (PAC), owned by businessman Julio César Arana. Its several British board members and numerous stockholders in London were pressured into making changes in the operations of the company. Many of the British shareholders divested themselves of this company in an effort to force changes. While Arana was forced to liquidate the PAC, he retained access to most of its assets as well as territory and he continued to operate in the rubber industry through the rubber enterprise of Cecilio Hernández. Casement wrote that he was convinced that "[t]he entire Indian population is enslaved in the montaña and whereupon the devil plant, the rubber tree, grows and can be tapped. The wilder the Indian the wickeder the slavery."

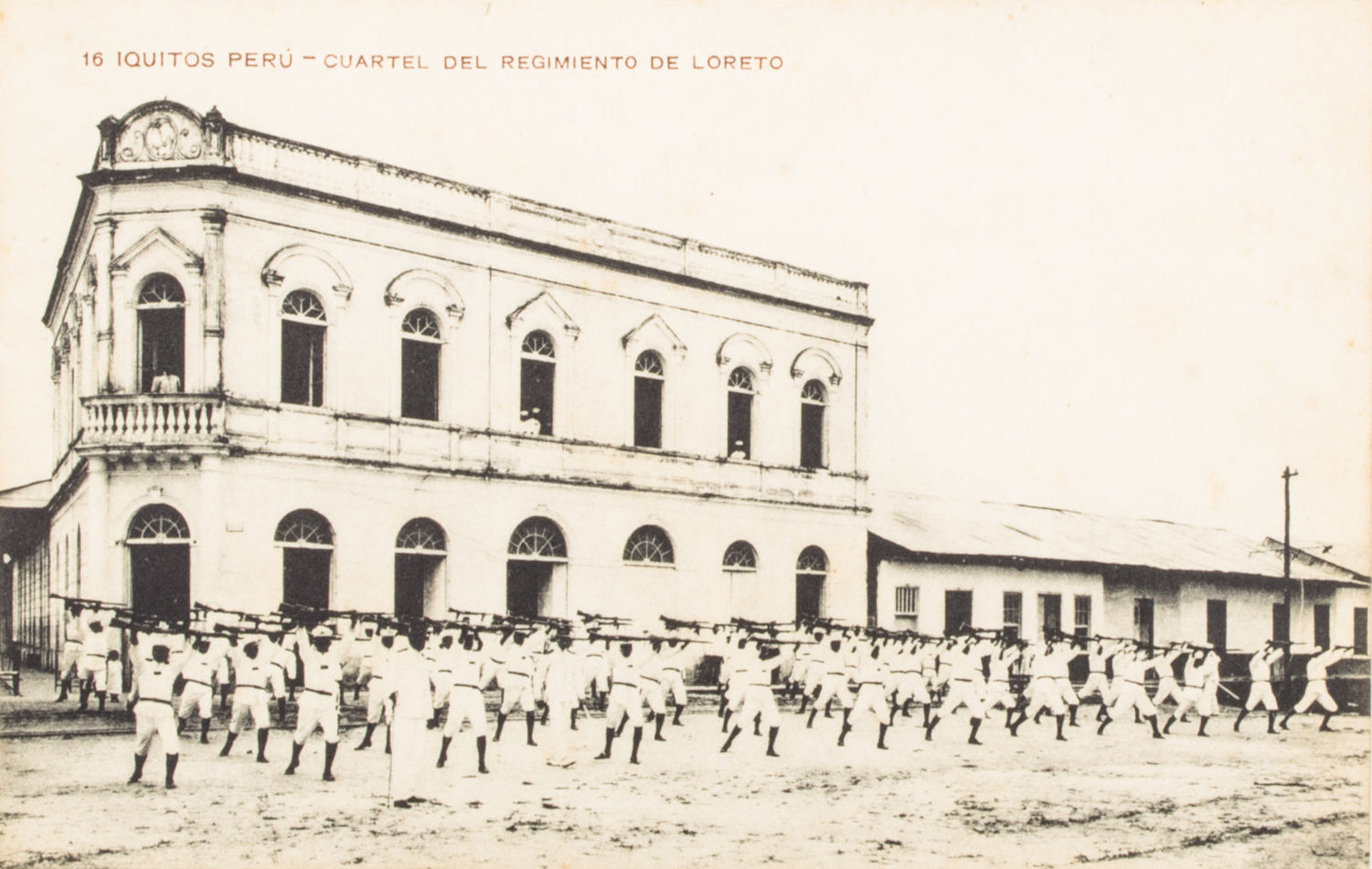
Barracks of the Loreto regiment in Iquitos, Peru

The army garrison at Iquitos was sent to the Caraparaná tributary of the Putumayo River in 1908 to assist Arana's company in acquiring several Colombian rubber estates through force. This detachment was accompanied by the Peruvian warship Iquitos. According to Victor Macedo, this garrison force consisted of 120 men, 80 of which had perished by 1910, mostly on the Caraparaná River.

In 1911, more than 237 arrest warrants were issued by judges Carlos A. Valcárcel and Rómulo Paredes against employees of the PAC due to their perpetration of the Putumayo Genocide. Pablo Zumaeta, a brother-in-law of Arana and the general manager of PAC, had an arrest warrant issued against him by Valcárcel on July 29, however Zumaeta requested to appeal it and this warrant was annulled by the Superior Court of Iquitos before the end of 1911. Zumaeta was permitted by local authorities and the Prefect to remain in his residency in Iquitos while his arrest warrant was active. Once the arrest warrant was annulled, Zumaeta was allowed to return to public life, he was out of hiding by November 2 of 1911. Valcárcel left Iquitos in protest of the Superior Courts decision to annul Zumaeta's warrant, Valcárcel was also accused by Zumaeta with "revealing public documents". The Superior Court of Iquitos dismissed Valcárcel from his office on the basis that he abandoned his post without permission.

Judge Rómulo Paredes, Pablo Zumaeta and Gennaro Herrera, another prominent citizen of Iquitos, all ran for the mayoral election of Iquitos in 1911, which was held on November 5 and 6. Paredes emerged as the candidate with the most votes from the election, in response to these results the political faction backing Zumaeta filed an appeal with the Junta Escrutadora, which decided to annul the election. The Junta Escrutadora consisted of five members, two of which, Juan Bautista Vega and Victor Israel, were known associates of Julio Cesar Arana. In 1912, Zumaeta became the mayor of Iquitos, he served another term in this office in 1914. Valcárcel issued arrest warrants against Julio Arana and Juan Bautista Vega on December 10 of 1912 however these were also annulled by the Superior Court of Iquitos. Many of those under the employ of Arana that were issued arrest warrants evaded capture. Two of the most prominent criminals involved in the Putumayo Genocide that were arrested, Armando Normand and Aurelio Rodríguez, escaped from prison at Iquitos in May 1915 prior to a verdict in their trial.

In 1912, Hardenburg published The Putumayo, the Devil's Paradise, the editor of this book noted that the English consul-general in Iquitos, David Cazes, should have been aware of human trafficking occurring between the Putumayo River and Iquitos. Judge Rómulo Paredes implicated Cazes with "aiding the guilty parties in keeping from the Peruvian Government an exact knowledge of what was taking place". The editor also wrote that the twenty-one constables employed by the Peruvian government on the Putumayo River "had all been bribed by the English traders and shut their eyes to what was happening in the jungle." Hardenburg reported that he had witnessed one Peruvian comisario on the Putumayo River, César Lúrquin, travelling on a steamship with a young indigenous Huitoto girl, Hardenburg concluded that Lúrquin intended to sell this child in Iquitos. Regarding Lúrquin, Hardenburg wrote "instead of stopping on the Putumayo, travelling about there and really making efforts to suppress crime by punishing the criminals, he contented himself with visiting the region four or five times a year—always on the company’s launches—stopping a week or so, collecting some children to sell, and then returning and making his “report.”"

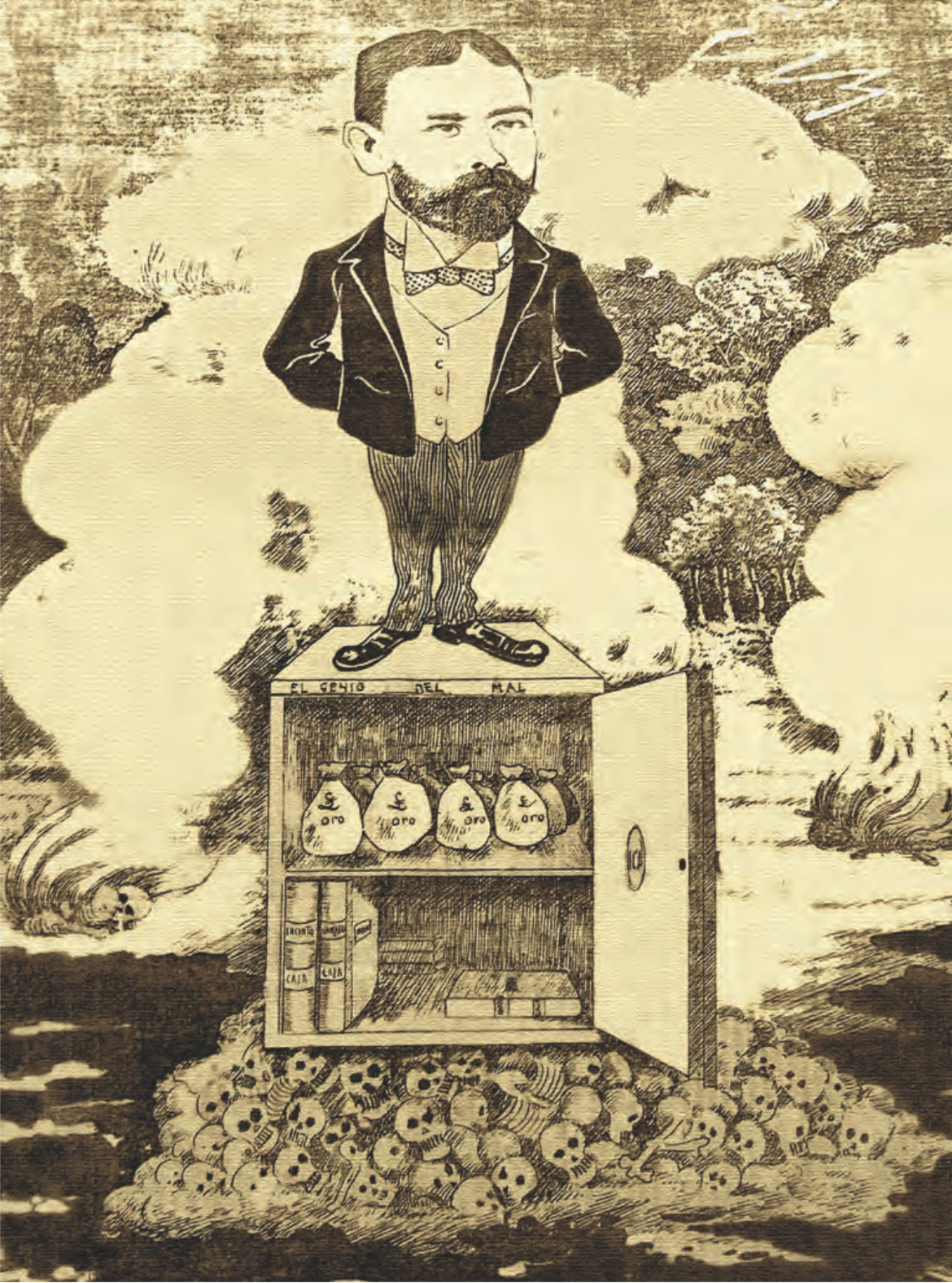
Illustration of the rubber baron Julio César Arana, published by the ‘La Felpa’ newspaper in 1908.

Anthropologist Michael Taussig claimed that David Cazes enterprise, the Iquitos Trading Company, was dependent on Julio César Arana's business. During Casement's investigation in 1910, he found out that several Barbadian men employed by the PAC had complained to Cazes that they were physically abused by agents of Arana's company: however Cazes did not relay this information to the British Foreign Office. Regarding Cazes, Casement wrote that "[h]e knew a very great deal of the Putumayo and kept it quiet – like everyone else in Iquitos. The Arana influence was too strong – and he was a trader and sold to them." Cazes was also aware of the newspaper publications of Benjamin Saldaña Rocca, which publicly denounced Arana's company for perpetrating atrocities against indigenous people, he did not forward this information to the British Foreign Office either. Prior to November of 1911, the Beatriz steamship, owned by Cazes's company, was chartered by the Peruvian government to transport Peruvian soldiers and supplies to the Putumayo River as well as transport rubber from the Peruvian Amazon Company on that river to Iquitos. On November 27 of 1911, Roger Casement wrote that Beatriz arrived at Iquitos with 41 tons of rubber, he noted that no freight was charged by the government for the transportation of this rubber. Casement was informed by Cazes that this was in accordance with an agreement between Arana's company and the Peruvian government.

During the Peruvian Amazon Company's perpetration of the Putumayo genocide, the company's steamships occasionally trafficked indigenous people to Iquitos, where they were sold. Walter Ernest Hardenburg wrote that every steamship that left the Putumayo carried "from five to fifteen little Indian boys and girls, who are torn, sobbing, from their mothers’ arms without the slightest compunction" Casement implicated several other rubber businesses with trafficking indigenous people on their steamships for the slave trade in Iquitos, specifically Wesche & Company and the Khan Polack Company, which were both operating on the Ucayali River. He emphasized that these companies were just as responsible for the propagation of a slave market in the region as the armed raiders carrying out slave raids against the indigenous people. The reason being that these two companies supplied the raiders and transported groups of enslaved indigenous people to Iquitos or towards rubber extraction camps. The head of Wesche & Company, Emilio Strassberger, was elected as mayor of Iquitos between 1912–1913.

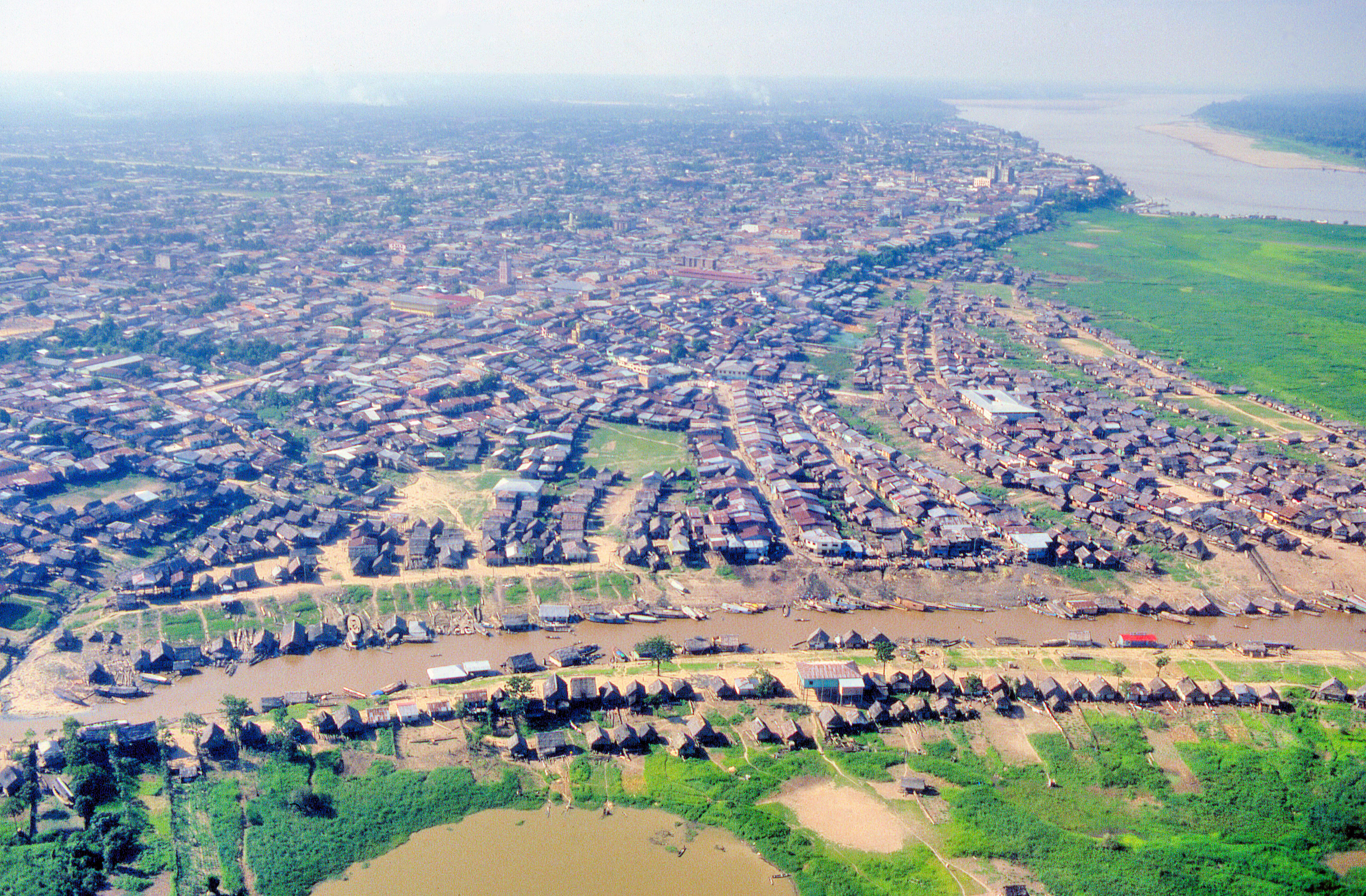
Aerial view of the city in 1987

Rubber from plantations in Asia was soon produced at lower cost, undercutting that of South America, and rubber declined in importance in Peru. Iquitos continued to operate as an important trading port in the Amazon basin. It exploited its timber, oil and mineral resources for export and processing, along with agricultural and other products.

Among the unique communities formed by the 19th-century immigrants to the rubber boom was one of Sephardic Jews from Morocco. Many of the men married native women and made families in Iquitos. They established a synagogue and the Jewish cemetery. In the first generation, some of the women or children converted to Judaism, but by the end of the 20th century, four or five generations later, most descendants were no longer practicing Jews. Most were reared as Catholic.

=== 20th century ===
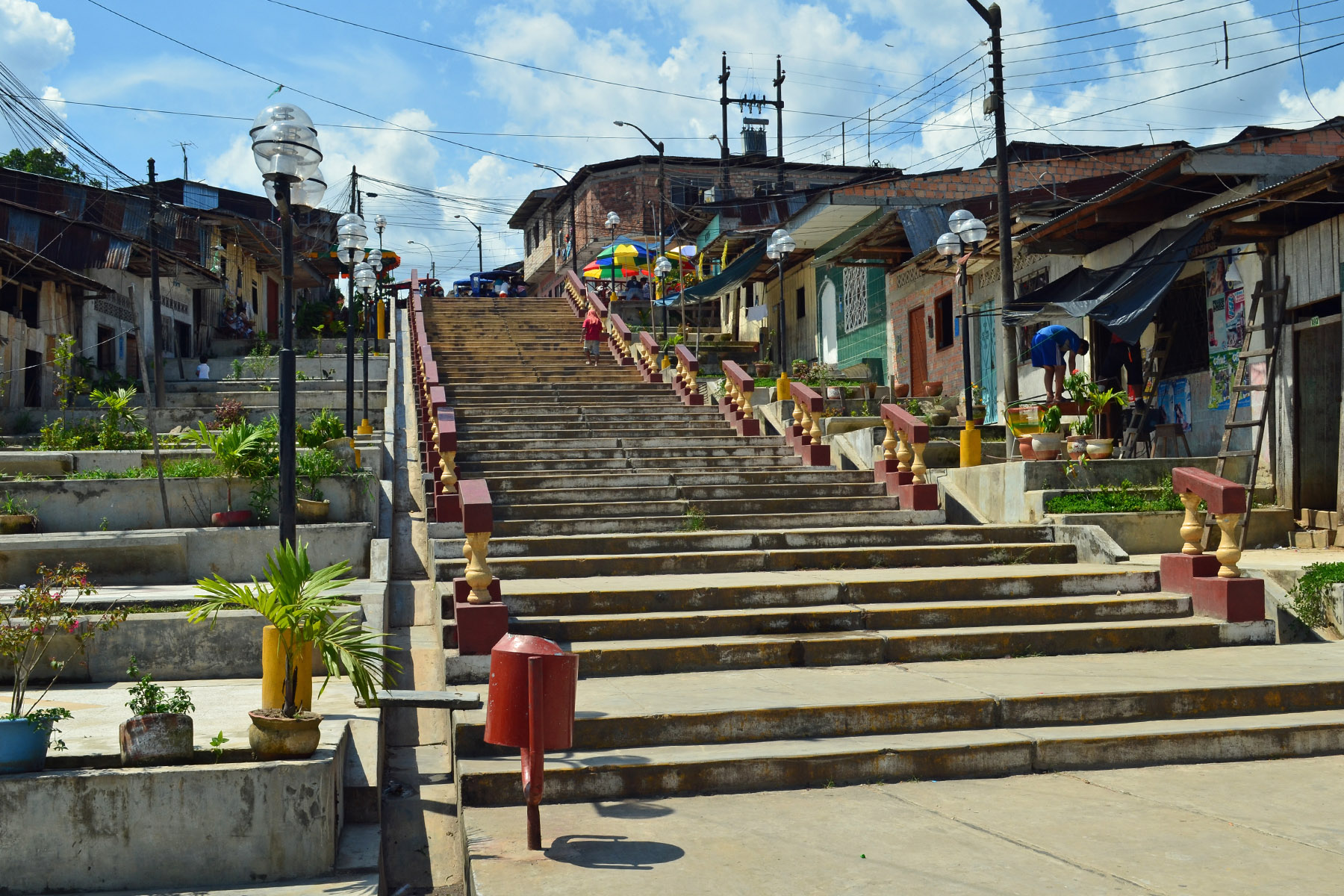
Belén District

In the 1990s, a descendant of a Jewish settler undertook serious study of Judaism. He began to revive the practice of Judaism among his family, friends, and other Sephardi descendants. After years of study, with the help of a sympathetic Conservative rabbi in Lima and another from Brooklyn, New York, eventually a few hundred people studied, practiced as Jews, and converted to Judaism. (Formal conversion was necessary according to Halakha as their mothers were not Jewish.) Many of the converts have emigrated to Israel under its Law of Return. A documentary was made about this community in 2010. Emigration of Peruvians from this Iquitos community has continued; about 150 emigrated in 2013 to 2014, see "Peruvian Jews in Israel" for more.

On 13 August 2012, a special plaque was placed in the plaza 28 de Julio of the city in a ceremony to commemorate the Amazon River and rainforest as one of the Seven Natural Wonders of the World. The plaque was forged in Munich, Germany. Iguazu Falls in Argentina has also been recognized as one of these top natural wonders.

In 2021, it was announced that a large (100 MW/100 MWH) solar and storage power facility would be built at Iquitos by 2026, replacing as much as half the diesel burned to produce electricity in the city.

== Geography ==
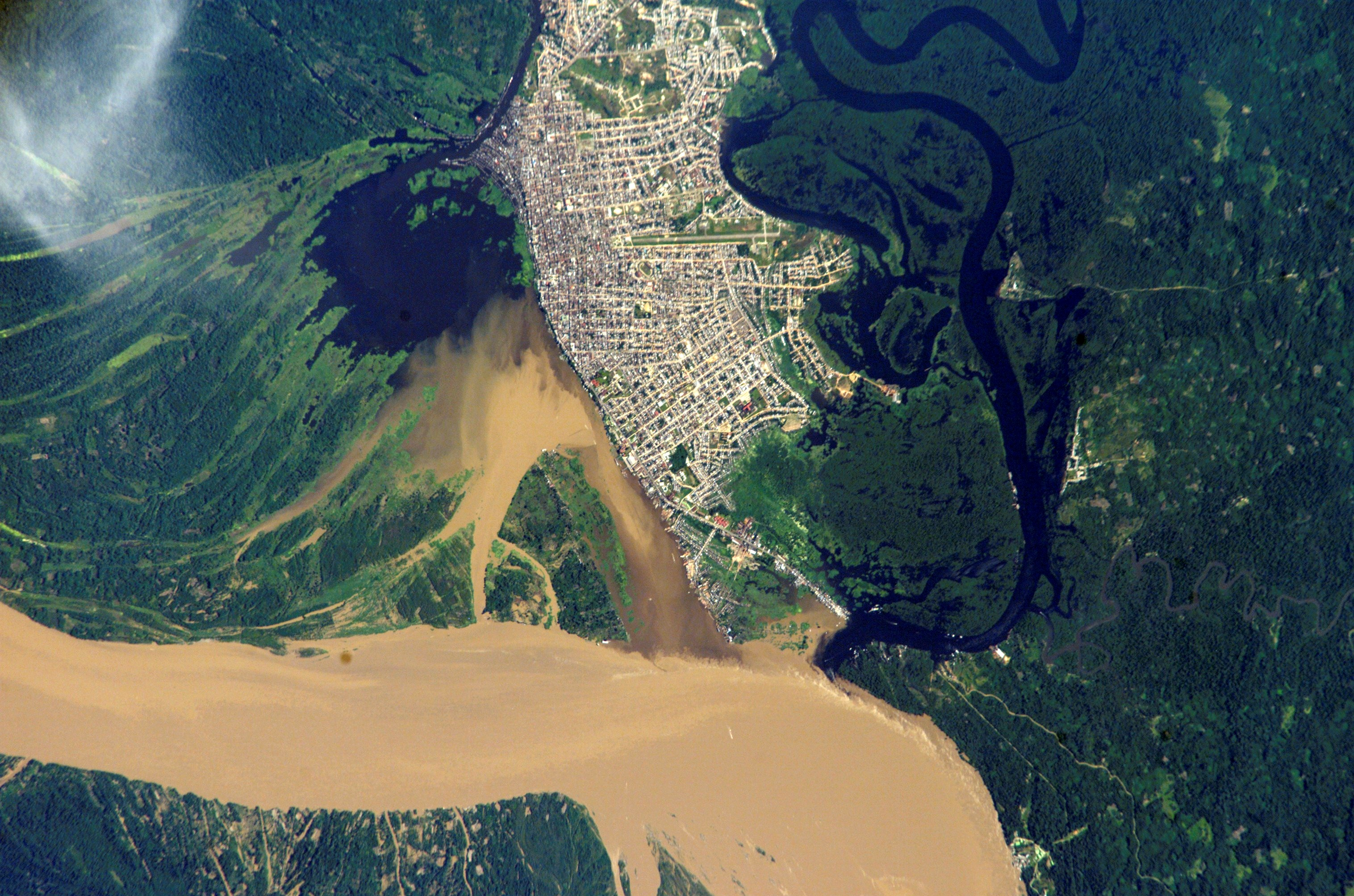
NASA satellite image showing the Amazon River Basin where Iquitos Metropolitan Area is located. The Amazon River appears on the lower side of the photograph.

Iquitos is located in northeastern Peru, northeastern Loreto Region, and in the extreme south of the Province of Maynas. Located on the Great Plains, the city has an area of 368.9 square kilometres (142.4 square miles), comprising the districts Belén, Punchana and San Juan Bautista. It is approximately at coordinates 03 ° 43'46 "S 73 ° 14'18" W to 106 metres (348 feet). It is the most northern Peruvian city.

It is surrounded by the Port of Iquitos, formed by the Amazon, Nanay and Itaya rivers. The city is situated on the left bank of the Amazon River, which provides a characteristic economic life, including trade and transport. The Itaya and Nanay rivers limit the physical expansion of the city in that direction; new development is growing toward the south and there is a slight population density in Downtown Iquitos. Close to Iquitos are a number of lagoons and lakes; Moronococha Lake is a boundary to the city on the west. These features make the city seem like a huge, faux river island.

Geologically, the city is settled in a Tertiary-Quaternary formation lithologically composed by little-consolidated lutites, with remains of flora or fauna, and numerous white-sand lenses of abundant silicon. The residual soils are sandy, almost clay-like and variably deep. Physiography, is a hazy landscape due to the undulations of the soil erosion caused by rain.

=== Climate ===
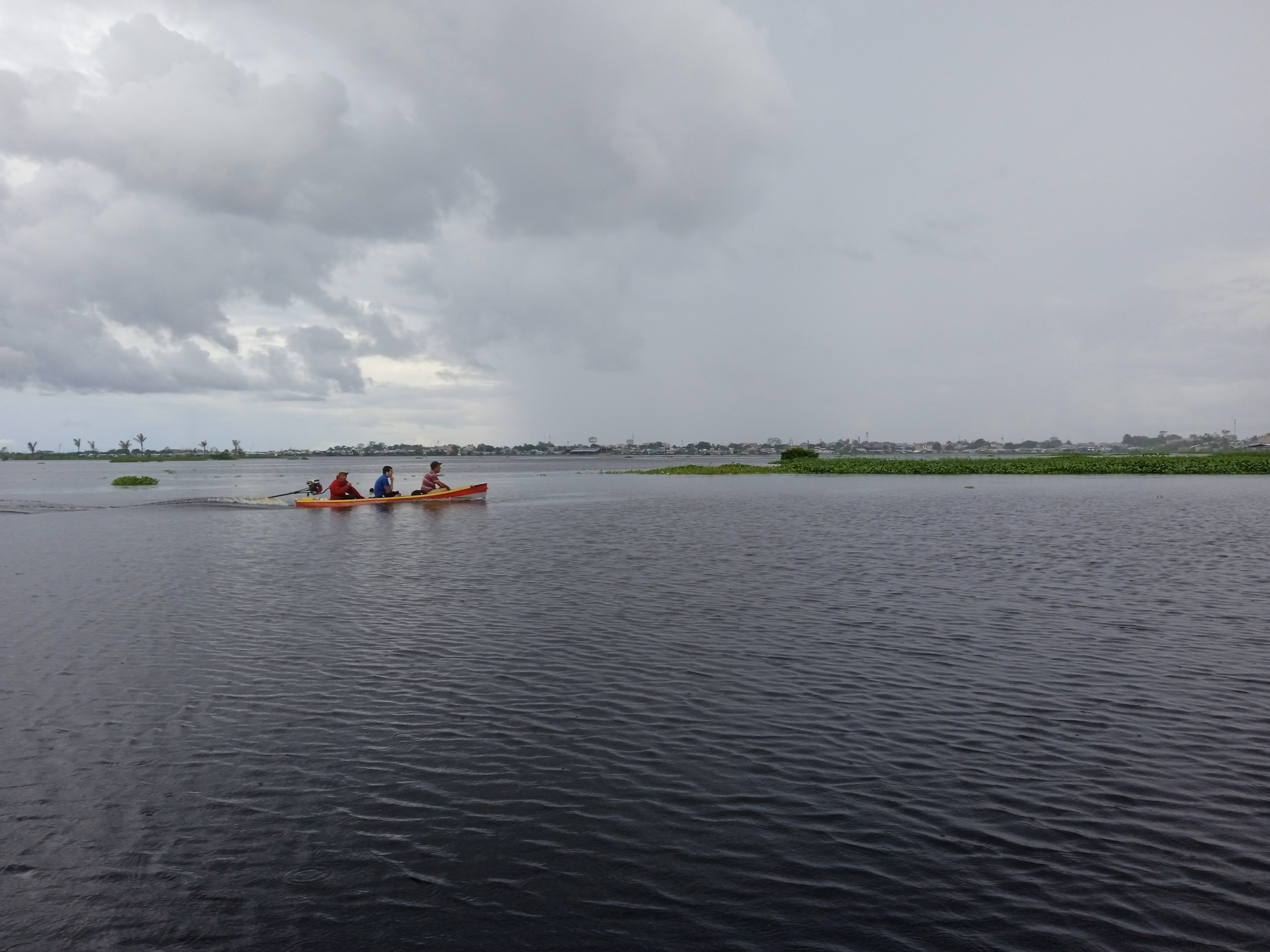
Nanay River

Iquitos experiences an equatorial climate that is a tropical rainforest climate (Af) under the Köppen climate classification, more subject to the Intertropical Convergence Zone than the trade winds and with no cyclones. There is constant rain throughout the year, without a distinct dry season, but a wetter summer. Because the seasons are not sensitive in the equatorial zone, Iquitos has only two seasons.

The rainy summer arrives in November and ends in May. March and April have the heaviest rains and humidity, with precipitation between 280 and 300 millimetres (11 and 12 in), respectively. In May, the Amazon River, one of the rivers surrounding the city, reaches its highest levels. It falls around 9 to 12 metres (30 to 39 ft) at its lowest point in October, and then steadily rises again cyclically according to rainfall.

Winter offers a drier, sunnier climate. Although July and August are the driest months, they have some periods of downpours. Sunny days and good weather are common. Rainfall is more abundant here than in Ayacucho, Cusco, or Lima.

Iquitos also has microclimates: rain or drizzle may be present in some areas of the districts, while other parts of the city are slightly cloudy or clear. The temperature may vary. The urban climate is slightly warmer than the natural climate, and would be reflected by the thermal sensation. It suffers from a phenomenon called urban heat island, when the city's heat has difficulty dissipating during the night hours due to absorption by buildings and pavement.

Climate data for Iquitos, Peru (1991–2020, extremes 1947–present)
Month	Jan	Feb	Mar	Apr	May	Jun	Jul	Aug	Sep	Oct	Nov	Dec	Year
Record high °C (°F)	42.2 (108.0)	37.0 (98.6)	42.2 (108.0)	36.2 (97.2)	39.0 (102.2)	35.2 (95.4)	37.8 (100.0)	41.1 (106.0)	38.4 (101.1)	37.8 (100.0)	37.4 (99.3)	36.5 (97.7)	42.2 (108.0)
Mean daily maximum °C (°F)	32.0 (89.6)	31.8 (89.2)	31.9 (89.4)	31.6 (88.9)	31.4 (88.5)	31.2 (88.2)	31.3 (88.3)	32.1 (89.8)	32.6 (90.7)	32.7 (90.9)	32.4 (90.3)	32.1 (89.8)	32.0 (89.6)
Daily mean °C (°F)	27.1 (80.8)	26.9 (80.4)	27.0 (80.6)	26.9 (80.4)	26.8 (80.2)	26.5 (79.7)	26.4 (79.5)	26.9 (80.4)	27.3 (81.1)	27.6 (81.7)	27.4 (81.3)	27.2 (81.0)	27.0 (80.6)
Mean daily minimum °C (°F)	22.1 (71.8)	22.1 (71.8)	22.2 (72.0)	22.3 (72.1)	22.3 (72.1)	21.9 (71.4)	21.5 (70.7)	21.7 (71.1)	22.0 (71.6)	22.4 (72.3)	22.4 (72.3)	22.3 (72.1)	22.1 (71.8)
Record low °C (°F)	17.0 (62.6)	18.0 (64.4)	17.0 (62.6)	17.8 (64.0)	16.0 (60.8)	15.0 (59.0)	13.0 (55.4)	14.0 (57.2)	15.0 (59.0)	17.0 (62.6)	17.2 (63.0)	18.3 (64.9)	13.0 (55.4)
Average rainfall mm (inches)	283 (11.1)	264 (10.4)	299 (11.8)	275 (10.8)	254 (10.0)	201 (7.9)	170 (6.7)	172 (6.8)	203 (8.0)	246 (9.7)	266 (10.5)	282 (11.1)	2,815 (110.8)
Average rainy days (≥ 1.0 mm)	14	13	15	14	13	11	10	10	11	12	12	13	148
Average relative humidity (%)	85.5	86.0	86.5	86.5	86.0	85.0	83.5	82.5	83.0	84.0	84.5	85.0	84.8
Mean monthly sunshine hours	153	151	143	136	146	145	160	228	169	158	152	155	1,896
Mean daily sunshine hours	5.4	5.3	4.9	5.3	5.6	6.3	6.9	7.3	7.1	6.4	6.0	5.1	6.0
Source 1: NOAA, Meteo Climat (record highs and lows)
Source 2: Deutscher Wetterdienst (mean temperatures 1949–1956, precipitation days 1970–1990, humidity 1951–1969, and sun)

=== Natural hazards ===
The main natural hazard is flooding. In 2012, major flooding occurred in Iquitos alerting the population and affected coastal areas and several towns in the metropolitan area, which has a floodable, rainy geography. The floods of 2012 were regarded as the most historic natural disaster to Iquitos to date. Wet weather in Loreto took showers and drizzle, causing damage and flooding in the Loreto Region since November 2011. The rainy weather continued until early 2012, and increased the level of water in the Amazon river—wide stream that feeds most of the tributaries in Loreto – up to 117 metres (384 feet). Since February and March, several villages are affected (19,209 and 18,400 families affected), 26 000 hectares of farmland are flooded and the water level reached coastal streets of Iquitos. On 24 April 2012, the spate faded, and initiated the first stage of ebb.

Other natural hazards are heat waves where temperatures can reach over 37 °C (99 °F) with a heat index of 45 °C (113 °F) which is caused by the low humidity on clear days. Cold waves are also curious in Iquitos: cold air from the tip of the continent driven by the dynamics of the atmosphere, comes to town and causes a drop in temperature, moderate rainfall and thunderstorms. The trade winds also come to cause gales reaching 60 km/h (37 mph). In October 2012, Iquitos experienced high temperatures and heavy thunderstorms.

Earthquakes in the city are very rare and very deep. Iquitos is located in Region 3 of Systematic Regionalization Map of Peru, which means that the city has a low coefficient seismic value, although the 2011 Peru earthquake, which occurred southeast of Contamana, was felt in the city as a small and unexpected jolt.

=== Ecology ===
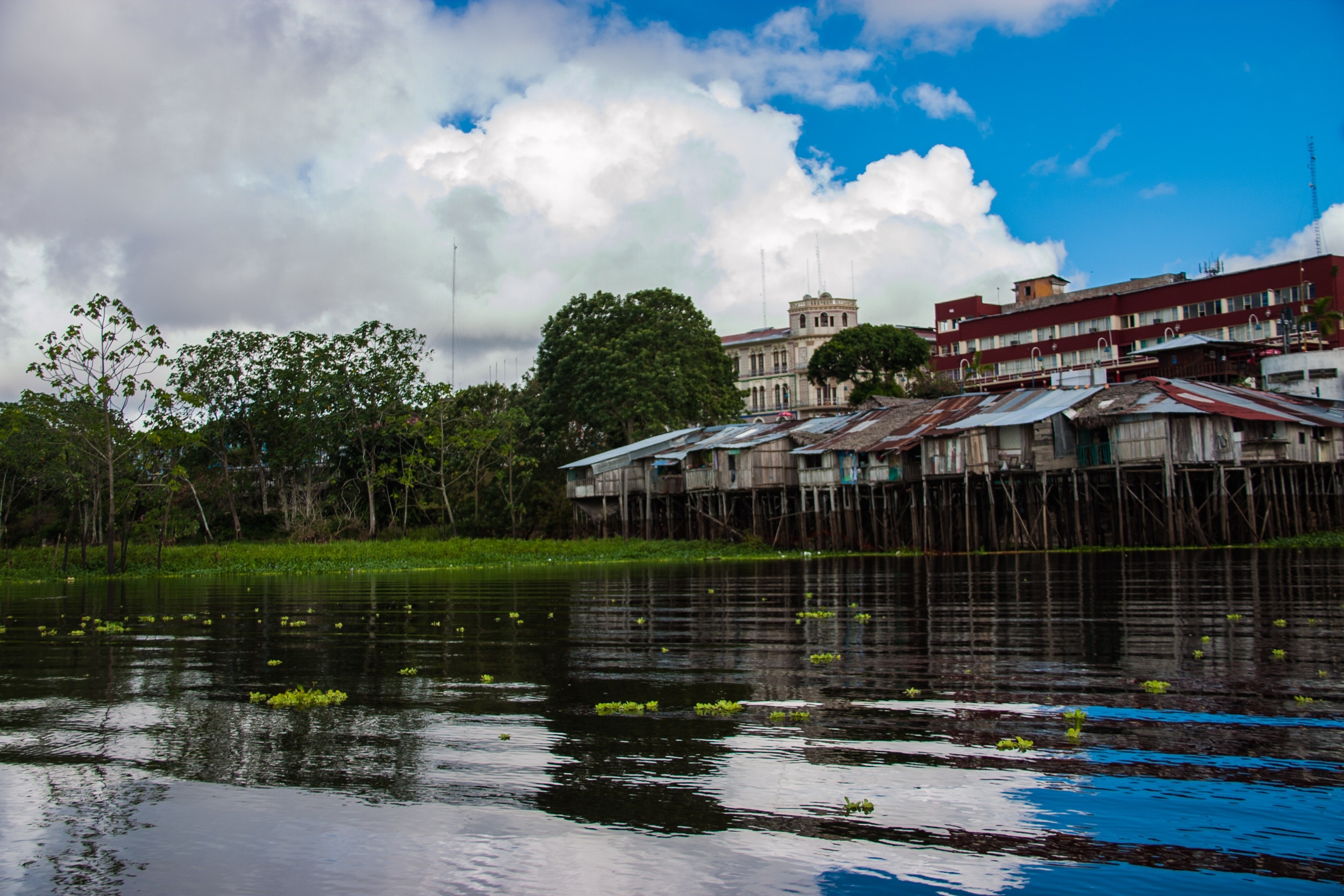
Itaya River

Due to its location in the Peruvian Amazon, Iquitos has a green landscape with a vast variety of life. The flora is varied with great presence of 850 species, including 22 species of palms and orchids, who provide the attractive forest within the urban landscape of the city. Lilies are also present. The extensive forests seated within the metropolitan area host fauna including 130 species of mammals, 330 species of birds, 150 species of reptiles and amphibians, and 250 species of fish. Within the city, inhabiting the rock dove (Columba livia), especially in the Square 28 de Julio. Also recorded is the transient presence of bull sharks (Carcharhinus leucas) who come from the Atlantic Ocean, traveling 3,360 miles to reach Iquitos.

The floodplain forest of Iquitos is the peculiar ecoregion which surrounds the city, and is characterized by a várzea forest called Iquitos varzea. Its alluvial detail is the motive why intense rainy seasons easily reach these areas flood. In the natural cycle, the trees drop their leaves and other organic waste to the soil, and become humus. Rain washes these nutrients into rivers, which gives that blonde color, called tannin. Immediately, this cycle repeats.

The great biodiversity that the Iquitos Metropolitan Area houses and protects is paramount, and that is intrinsically related to its urban planning, which puts a limit action in areas where farms should not be built. Because of this, the appearance of informal settlements is seen as a risk.

=== Natural reserves and zoos ===
The importance of the existence of nature reserves is a priority in Iquitos for ecosystem protection.

The Allpahuayo-Mishana National Reserve is a protected area with soaring rates of biodiversity. The reserve is located 20 kilometres (12 miles) from Iquitos, being reached by Route LO-103. The ecosystem is part of the Nanay River basin, specifically in an area called "Ecoregion Napo", which contains unique Amazonian biodiversity, including its distinctive white sand forests. The Napo Ecoregion contains 112 species of amphibians, 17 species of primates, 1900 plant species and over 600 bird species. Some ecologically important animals valued for their rarity in the reserve are the supay pichico (Callimico goeldii), black stump (Callicebus torquatus), equatorial saki (Pithecia aequatorialis) ancient antwren (Herpsilochmus gentryi), Mishana tyrannulet (Zimmerius villarejoi), Allpahuayo antbird (Percnostola arenarum), chestnut-tailed ant (Myrmeciza centuculorum castanea), the pompadour cotinga (Xipholena punicea), saffron-crested tyrant-manakin (Neopelma chrysocephalum), among others. The Iquitos gnatcatcher (Polioptila clementsi) is an endemic species of the reserve and is considered a symbol of Iquitos.

Quistococha Tourist Complex is characterized by its variety. The place is located 6 kilometres (3.7 miles) from Iquitos via Route AS-103, and with an extension 369 hectares (910 acres) of natural forest, has a small zoo, a serpentarium, an aquarium, a nursery and an artificial beach called Tunchi Beach.

The butterfly zoo Pilpintuwasi is located in Padre Cocha, Iquitos, and includes more than 40 species of insects, especially butterflies. Along the butterfly zoo, is the Amazon Animal Orphanage, commissioned in animal rescue.

== Demography ==
Historical population
Year	Pop.	±%
1808	171	—
1842	200	+17.0%
1860	300	+50.0%
1862	431	+43.7%
1864	648	+50.3%
1876	1,475	+127.6%
1903	9,438	+539.9%
1928	22,575	+139.2%
1961	57,772	+155.9%
1964	76,400	+32.2%
1972	110,402	+44.5%
1981	178,738	+61.9%
1993	274,759	+53.7%
2007	370,962	+35.0%
2012	457,865	+23.4%
2015	471,993	+3.1%

In 1808, Hipolito Sanchez Rangel, the bishop of Maynas, reported that the village of Iquitos had 171 inhabitants and on 8 June 1842, the date when the town was elevated to a district, it had just over 200 inhabitants.

In 1860, according to Paz Soldan, the town had only 300 inhabitants. Two years later, the population increased to about 431 inhabitants and in 1864, there were 648 people, predominantly mestizo due to the presence of families from Borja, Santiago, Santa Teresa, Barranca and others, who fled away from the attack on the Huambisas and Aguaruna native and destroyed the villages.

According to Genaro Herrera, in 1866, Iquitos had a population of 648 people. For 1876, again the same author reports a population of 1,475 inhabitants.

In 1903, in the middle of the rubber boom, Iquitos had 9,438 inhabitants (census of Benito Lords), of which 542 were foreigners, most of them from Spain (95) Brazil (80), China (74), Portugal (64) and as many from Italy, England, France, Ecuador, United States, Russia, Switzerland and Morocco.

Currently, Iquitos has emerged as the largest city in the Peruvian Amazon. Counted by the census of 2007 with 406,340 inhabitants.

== Government ==
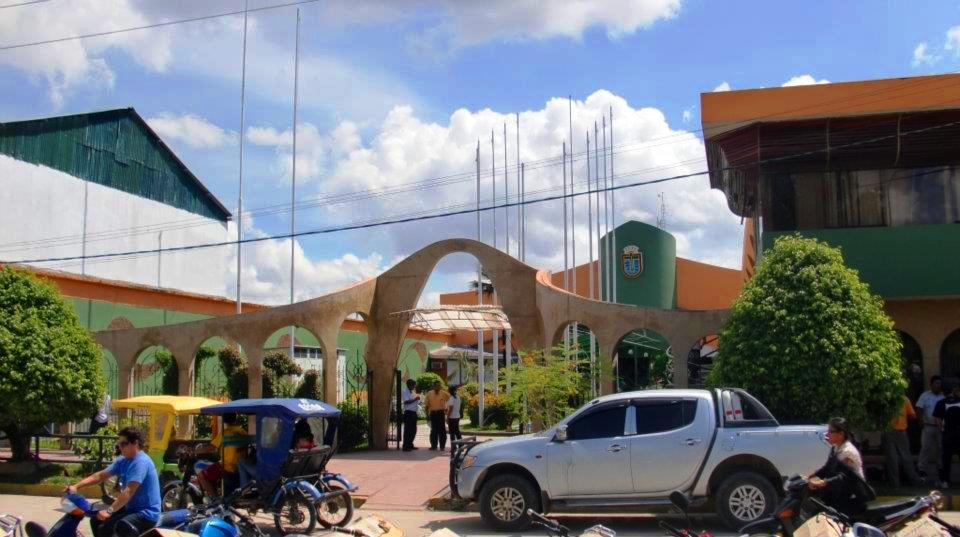
Headquarters of Provincial Municipality of Maynas which is the main political entity that administers the city.

Iquitos is a provincial municipality with a system of government headed by a Provincial Council, composed of the Mayor and fifteen aldermen. The Provincial Municipality of Maynas (MPM) is the main body that has jurisdiction in the Maynas Province and Iquitos District, and authorities are elected by popular vote. The municipal government is responsible for planning development and territorial order within its jurisdiction and promoting strategic coordinace within the district order. It is responsible for public education, correctional institutions, libraries, public safety, urban planning, regulation of all types of transportation, municipal tax collection, maintenance of public roads (asphalt, cleaning, etc..) and gardens, promoting culture and preservation of architecture and public places, among others. The Municipal Manager is responsible "to direct, coordinate, monitor and evaluate the technical, financial and administrative of the Municipality".

The MPM has support bodies formed by the General Secretariat, the Office of Institutional Image, Administrative Management, Revenue Management and the General Office of Information. The line agencies are bureaucratic managers with a distinct role and have the function of carrying out the institution's mission, which includes the Territorial Conditioning, Sanitation and Environmental Health, Works and Infrastructure, Traffic and Public Transport, Social Development, Economic Development and Municipal Services. The MPM organizes the Municipal Ombudsman Service of Child and Adolescent.

The mayor was Adela Jimenez, an architect, chosen by the National Jury of Elections to fill temporarily to Charles Zevallos who was suspended for health reasons. Jimenez was the first woman to hold the office of mayor provincial and Iquitos. Current mayor is Francisco Sanjurjo Dávila.

The political geography of Iquitos consists of four districts or communes, each with a district municipality. Except for Iquitos District which does not have a district municipality and as such, the Provincial Municipality of Maynas also functions as its council district. The other districts are with a respective one: District Municipality of Punchna, the District Municipality of San Juan Bautista and the District Municipality of Belén. Each municipality has control in its own district, and each has a policy of urban planning that is created according to the state of its district.

In 2025, Iquitos entered into its first sister city partnership with Lafayette, Colorado, following mutual municipal approvals earlier in the year and a formal signing ceremony in Lafayette that focused on cultural and educational exchange between the Peruvian Amazon and the Colorado Front Range.

== Metropolitan area ==
The four urban districts of Iquitos: 1: Iquitos 2: Belén 3: Punchana 4: San Juan Bautista. The suburban and urban production zones are narrowly close to urban areas, especially south of San Juan. The limits are indicative because the city experienced a remarkable expansion.

The city is the urban core of Iquitos Metropolitan Area. It is a conurbation consists of four districts that are heavily populated in the city, while rural areas become more so away from the downtown. The Iquitos District is the urban origin of the city and the metropolitan area. Moronacocha, which has 85,000 inhabitants, could become the fifth district of Iquitos.

Iquitos is composed of four districts.

- Iquitos (Iquitos District: 163,594 inhabitants) is the main district of the city, and is the most visited by tourists. The center of Iquitos, located in the heart of the district, is best known, and it has most of the activities of economy, culture, entertainment, art and commerce of the city. The Plaza de Armas is the tourist point of departure for most tourists, along with the Casa de Fierro, the Iglesia Matriz, the former Palace Hotel, the Boulevard de Iquitos, the Malecon Tarapaca and the Amazon Library.
- Belén (Municipality of Belen District: 74,551 inhabitants) is one of the districts of the city known mainly for its intense commercial activity and the Belen Neighborhood, called the "Venice" by iquiteños. It is located on the east side of Iquitos and was created on 5 November 1999.
- Punchana (Municipality of Punchana District: 85,179 inhabitants) is the northern district of Iquitos and was created on 17 December 1987, and is characterized more by its port activity and Bellavista-Nanay market. Punchana capital has a small district capital called Villa Punchana. 90% of the district is composed of urban land, while 10% is rural. In the history of Iquitos, Punchana started as a small hamlet and the name of the district is due to a kind of wild agouti, which was cared for in a breedingground at the beginning of the 20th century.
- San Juan Bautista (Municipality of San Juan Bautista District: 124,143 inhabitants), colloquially known as San Juan, is the largest district of Iquitos, and which is constantly expanding to the south of the city due to the arrival of new families to the city —also embraces remote areas beyond the urban Iquitos, such as the Quistococha Resort and Zoo. Before promoted as a populous district in the presidency of Fernando Belaunde in the 1960s, the district was a sparsely populated road. Currently, several human settlements are in the "expansive" border areas. In this district, there are several tourist spots such as the San Juan Craft Market, the beaches of Santa Clara and St. Thomas, and Allpahuayo-Mishana National Reserve (located in the Iquitos-Nauta Highway).

The metropolitan area of Iquitos is also organized by another system subdivisions, less known by the local colloquialism.

- Downtown Iquitos houses the historical extension of Iquitos, and its main shopping and entertainment movement. This includes closely eastern union between Iquitos and Belen districts.
- North Iquitos comprises Punchana and northern Iquitos.
- South Iquitos comprises mostly San Juan Bautista, sectors such as Terminal and much of its length south.
- West Iquitos comprises the western parts of the Iquitos District as Moronacocha.
- East Iquitos would be hosting in all the Belén District, and the eastern part of Belén.

== Economy ==
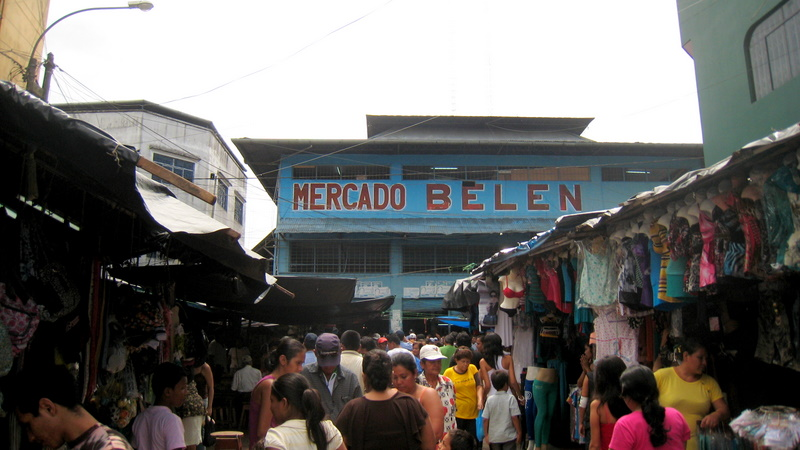
The Belen Market is the largest street market in the Peruvian Amazon, and an important commercial and economic exchange.

Iquitos is a main center of commerce, tourism and industry in the Amazon rainforest with the world. As gateway to the Peruvian Amazon, the economy of many parts of the region come to Iquitos for sustainable control. The Economic Development Management of the Provincial Municipality of Maynas is responsible for regulating and regulate trade, business development and employment, tourism and rural production both Iquitos District as whole Maynas Province.

The city is a major center for finance, sales, transportation, tourism, media, while major industries that work is the timber, petroleum, gas, flour milling, oil, rum, camu camu and bakery. The fishing industry is another big support for the economy of the city. The Belen Market has a frenetic commercial activity that is part of its economy. Iquitos has great financial backing has been able to help it progress now since its role in the rubber boom, although must be overcome with effort after the rubber was no longer produced in the city. The petroleum industry, despite being outside the urban area of Iquitos, has greatly influenced its evolution. In addition, trade has mainly helped the growth of the city. In San Juan Bautista, economic development is based on agriculture (sugar cane, pijuayo, caimito), fish, poultry, livestock (cattle, bubaline) and mining. The petroleum, one of the most precious resources, extracted mainly from the region northwest of Loreto and part of it is transported to the refinery in Iquitos. The timber transport is another important economic factor, however, due to the Free Trade Agreement between Peru and the United States, the gross exploitation of timber has decreased considerably.

With projects of large malls, the city still has a trade-in retail stores and minimarkets throughout the metropolitan area, more strongly in main avenues such as Prospero, Arica, Grau and Alfonso Ugarte located in the center of Iquitos and the Belén District. Retail distribution of imported products has created regional and social stratification that goes from the merchant importer to urban retailer, which serves as a strong link between the urban and rural economy.

== Education ==
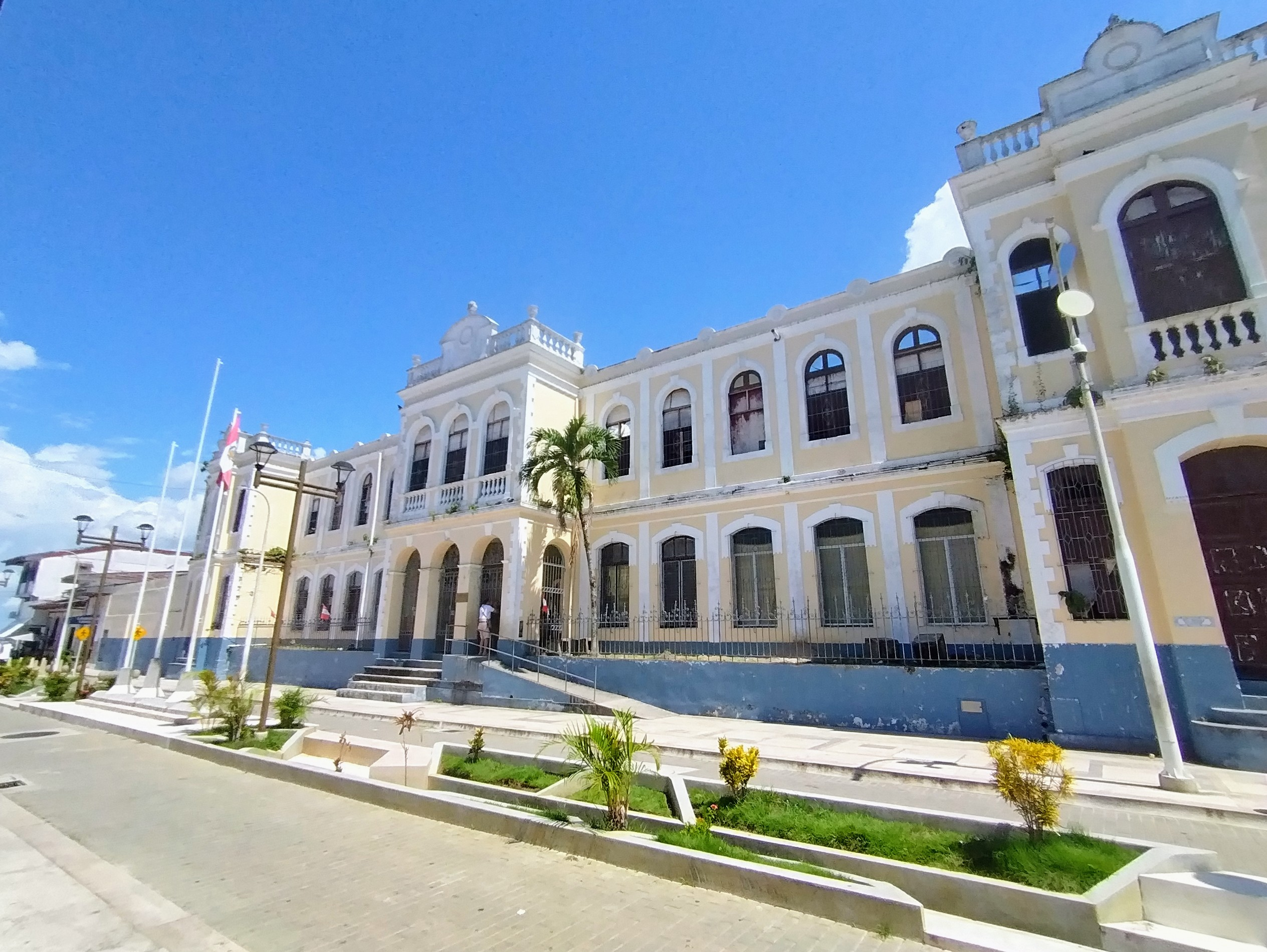
Colegio Fernando Lores

Iquitos is home to numerous research projects on ecology related to ornithology and herpetology. Cornell University owns a field station dubbed the Cornell University Esbaran Amazon Field Laboratory. Founded in July 2001 under the direction of Dr. Eloy Rodriguez, the facility is dedicated to education, conservation, and the discovery of novel medicinal compounds from applied field chemoecology.

The field lab strives to survey and catalog the biological diversity found along the Yarapa River Basin. It provides researchers with field experience in the broad range of disciplines necessary for this task. Another major goal is to explore value-added derivatives of biodiversity. This includes both tangible returns, in the form of new discoveries in the biomedical and related sciences, as well as less tangible goods, such as the promotion of ecotourism and an ecological ethic. They work to ensure benefits to the local communities, and to participating students and researchers.

=== Universities ===
Iquitos has Universidad Nacional de la Amazonía Peruana (UNAP), the local state university, and the private institutions Universidad Científica del Perú (UCP) and Universidad Tecnológica del Perú (UTP). It is also home to the Instituto de Investigaciones de la Amazonía Peruana (IIAP), the Research Institute of the Peruvian Amazon.

== Cityscape ==
=== Architecture ===
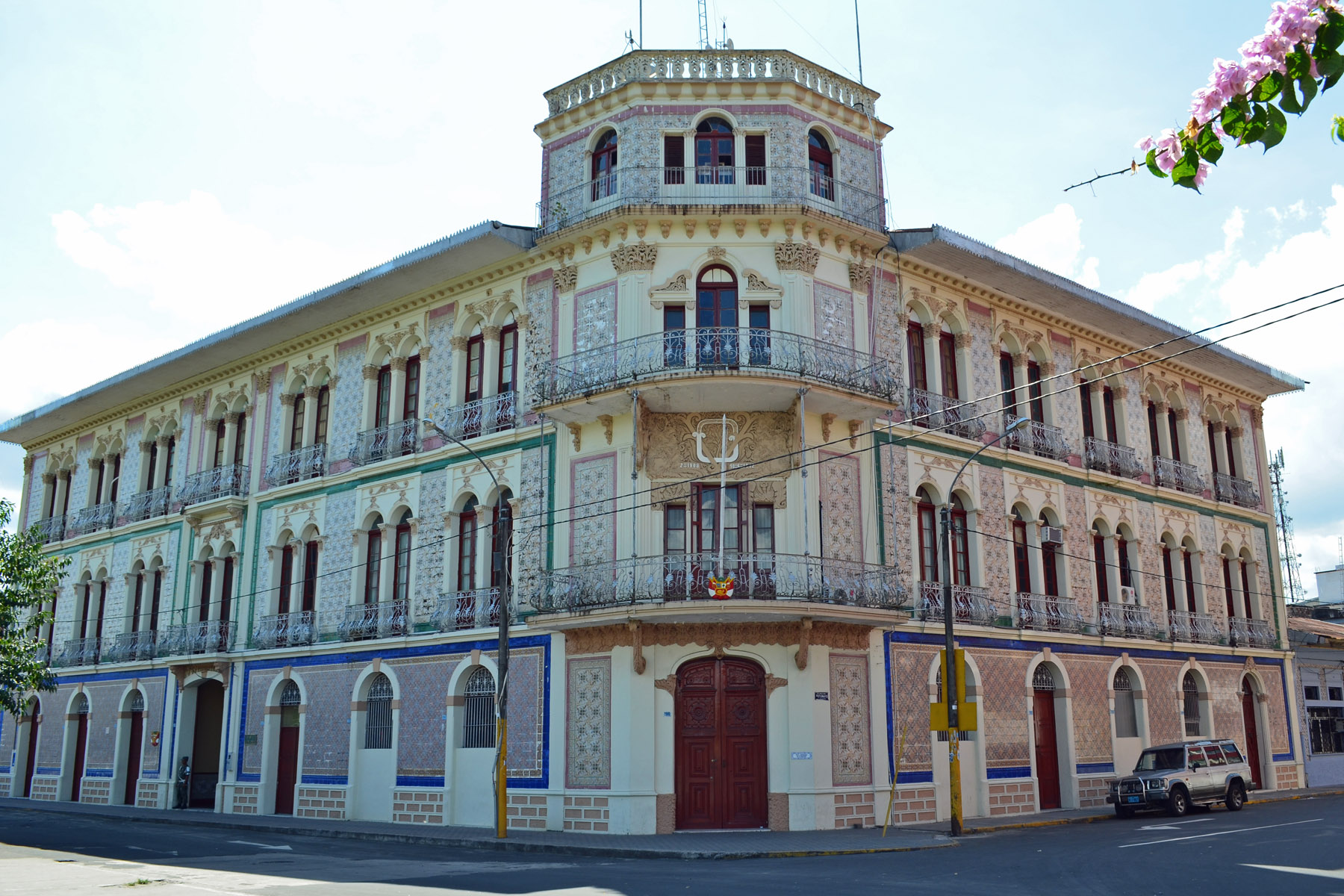
The former Hotel Palace (built from 1908 to 1912) by Samuel Young Mass, located on the first block of Jiron Putumayo, in an area known as the Malecón Tarapacá.

Iquitos has architecturally significant buildings in a particular range of structural remnants were built during the rubber boom of the 1880s. The buildings are mainly European/Amazonian-style with ceramic tiles imported from Italy and Portugal, and the city's unique French architecture called Casa de Fierro built by Gustave Eiffel, who built the original house in Paris for an exhibition of 1878. However, the structure is not the only European urban appeal: the city is also characterized by the rustic architecture or conventional as the palafitte, malocas and huts that are located primarily in the areas of the city.

Historically, the first native inhabitants of the settlements built their houses of sticks and leaves and other natural resources, which were tailored to protect against the climate, wildlife and other hazards. The styles of housing in those settlements were huts and cocameras, used as large communal houses. Other notable conventional architectures are characterized by their firmness and isothermal conditions; they are categorized into three types of home: quincha —built with posts and giant cane—, rammed earth —resistant and isothermal—, and adobe —irm with the same isothermal condition.

The rubber boom of the 1880s caused a severe change in the architectural style of Iquitos. Foreign and rubber barons brought with them the influence of countries like Spain, Portugal, France, Germany, and descendants as Sephardim. Jose de Jesus Reategui and a young group built the main features of the urban city during the rubber boom, including the Iglesia Matriz de Iquitos. In the Iquitos popular belief of the 19th century, iron was considered less humane and aesthetic, but Gustave Eiffel got the Casa de Fierro became an attraction in the city, although historically the prefabricated building was not designed for Iquitos. Baroque and Rococo style also influenced the architecture of Iquitos, and defense against the rain was another prominent feature added to buildings. About 90 buildings are declared architectural heritage sites of Loreto.

== Culture and contemporary life ==
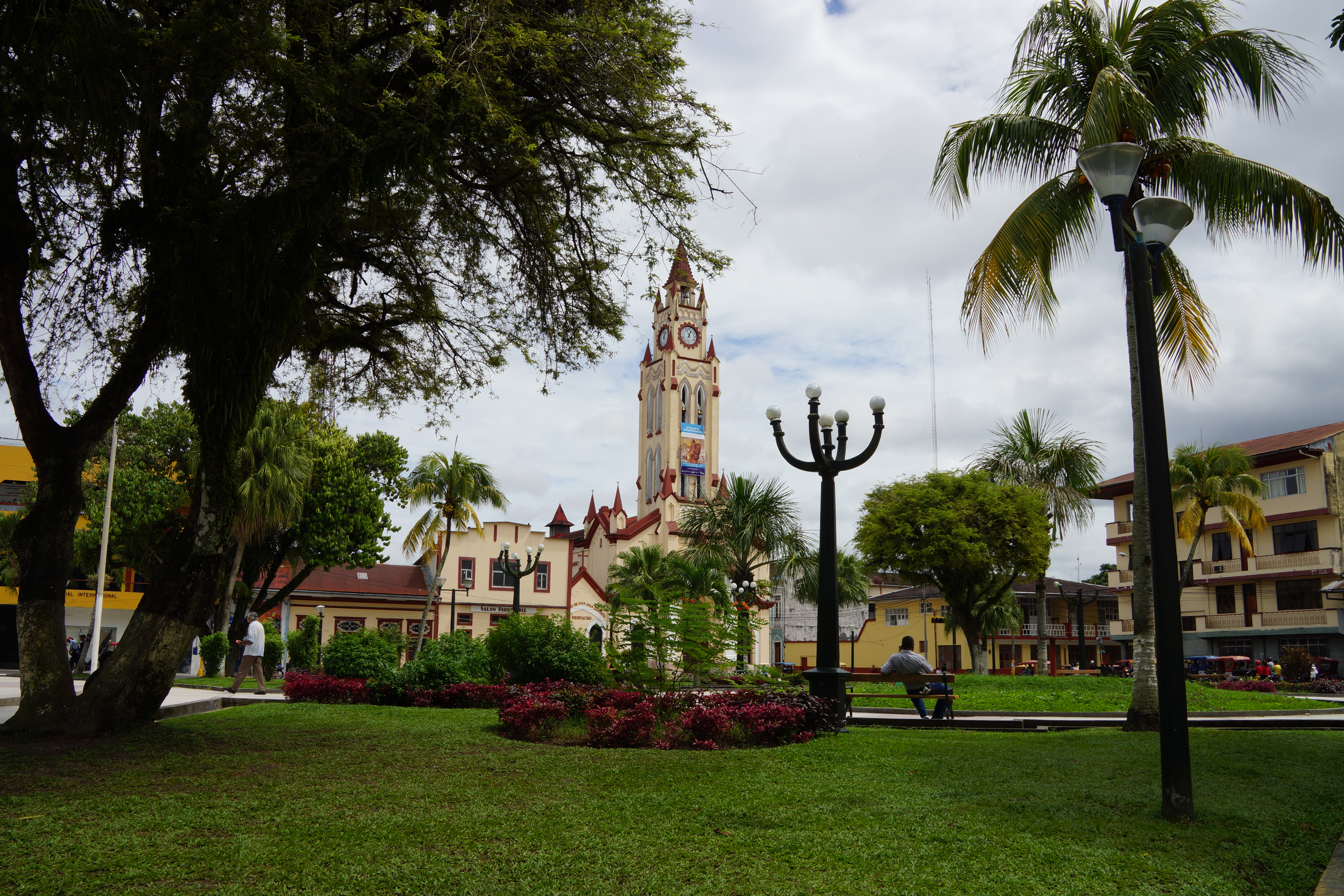
The Plaza de Armas and the Iglesia Matriz (near the middle of the image) in the downtown Iquitos

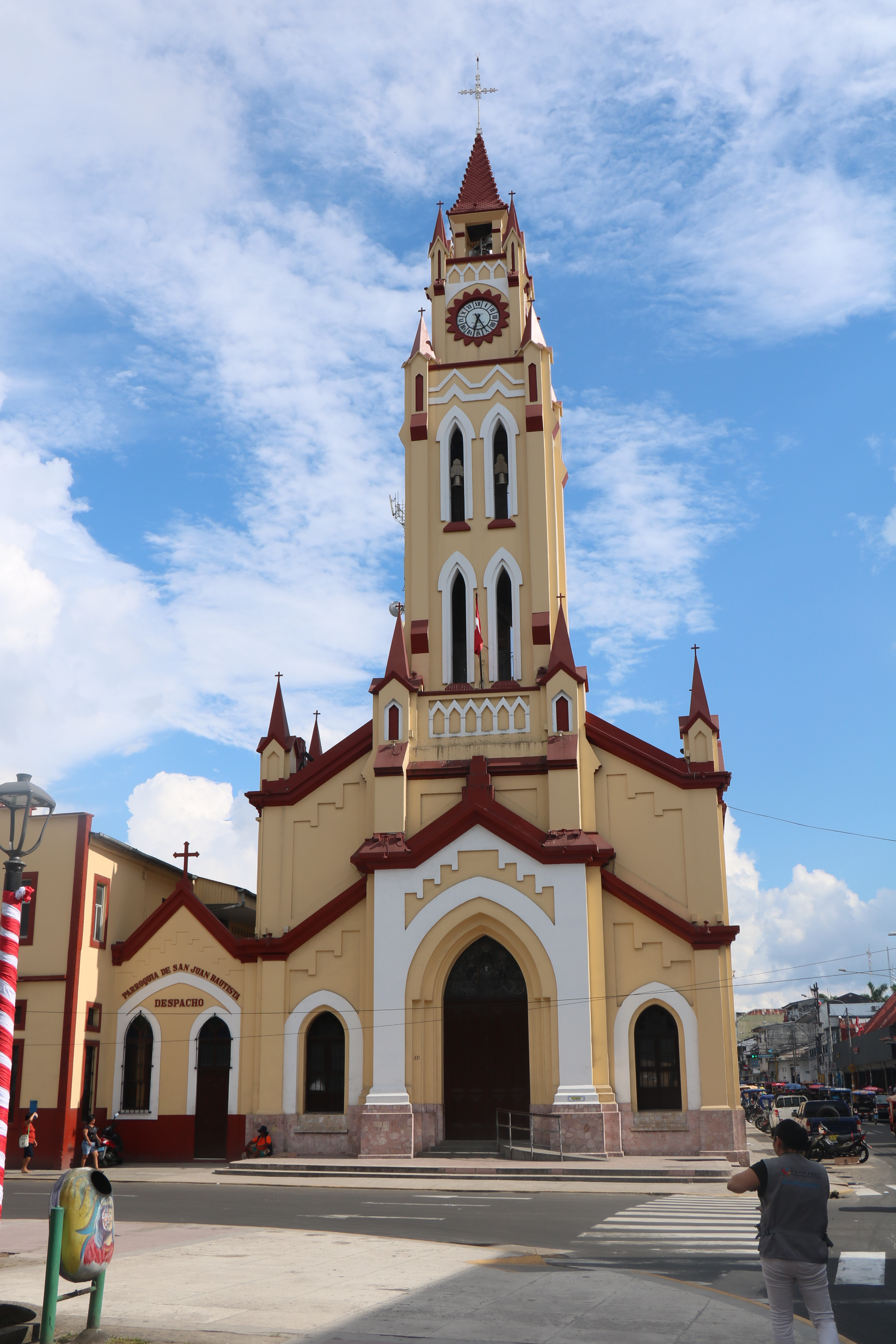
The Iglesia Matriz de Iquitos is characterized by its Gothic Revival style and Swiss clock. It is considered one of the symbols of the city.

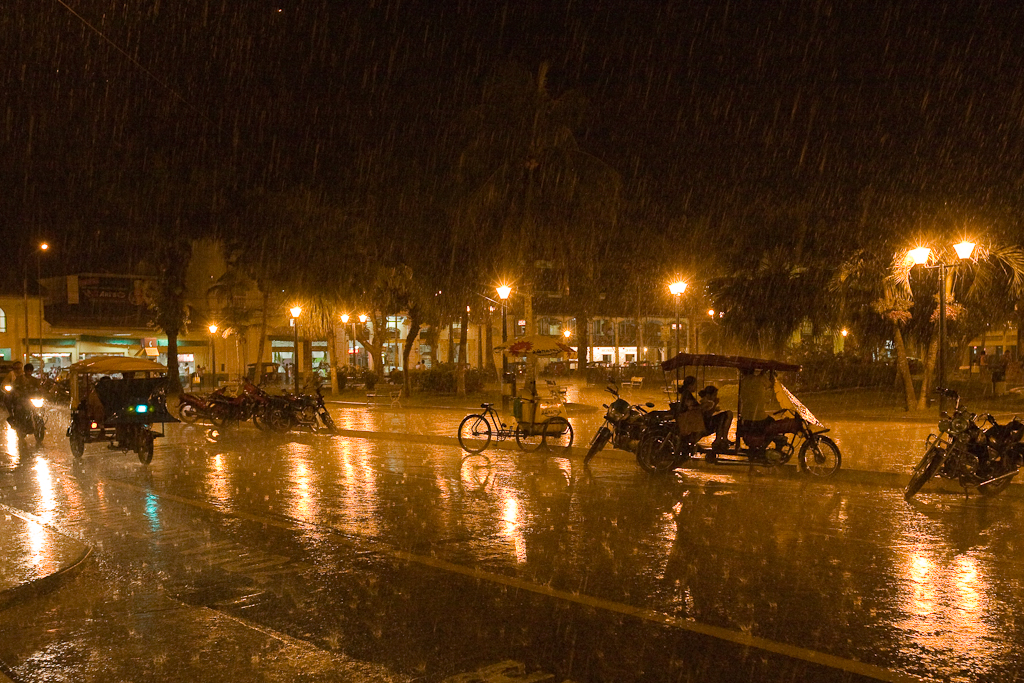
The Plaza de Armas at night

Iquitos has a diverse culture, and is regarded as the cultural hub of the Peruvian Amazon, according to Lonely Planet. Many natives visit the city to showcase their dances or sell their crafts. The city has customs and traditions that have remained over the years such as following the Iquitos calendar, celebrating cultural festivities, cuisine, Spanish accent and mythology. Its culture is undergoing a transition to a contemporary level to preserve traditions with art movements.

One of the main factors of the traditional cultural energy of Iquitos is Amazonian mythology, which has a range of characters, identified by folklore in imaginary beings. Many of the legendary beings, with appearances motivated by local geography, have powers and influenced much in agriculture and worldview of Iquitos. The dance and music, a mix of indigenous and mestizo heritage are closely related to the meanings of mythology, and also with the life of the citizen and Amazonian villager.

The complex cultural life of Iquitos consists mainly of native iquiteños, Brazilians, Colombians, Chineses and settled expatriates ethnicities. The term "charapa culture" generally refers to social, cultural and artistic movements of Iquitos.

Iquitos has a unique culture that is strongly felt, as the following quotes says:

We are in the city of the alteration of the senses. [...] What is striking me is the ease with which iquitenses [sic] engage in conversation with tourists, with a warmth and naturalness that is rarely seen in my native place.

— Max Palacios, in his blog Amores bizarros.

Although I'm a veteran of several South American adventures, Iquitos appealed to me as a quirk – a jungle city seems a contradiction and this would be my first Amazon visit to include the cosmopolitan luxuries of a real bed and shops. I'm fascinated at the very audacity by which such a city exists, thousands of kilometres from anywhere and with no roads to get there.

— Jade Richardson, in an article titled "In an urban jungle"

Nothing more appropriate to think of a fantastic city as a city of Atonement. Iquitos is an island, surrounded by an immense and immeasurable river, an island that goes wherever you go one to be crossed with fresh water and warm, with boats and small kids, with men and boys in the sun on the beach, with sirens and buzzards and myths. A city that faced conflicts and wars against three countries, which suffered considerable infighting and even for some months it has its own currency. Island, yes; city, yes.

— Edwin Chavez, writing about the idiosyncratic essence of the city.

Contemporary cultural movements began in the city, such as the Amazonian pop art and Amazonian graffiti—with Pukuna 8990 being the most revolutionary graffiti movement—Iquiteño music subgenres of electronica, hip hop, rap, heavy metal, French jazz, punk, psytrance/full-on, next to traditional Amazonian music. The Children's and Youthful Symphonic Orchestra of Iquitos is the main symphonic group in the city.

Iquitos has been benchmarked over the years in literature and film. The Peruvian writer Mario Vargas Llosa wrote his work Captain Pantoja and the Special Service inspired by the city. Francisco Lombardi's 2000 film, based on the novel by Vargas Llosa was filmed in this city. In Rómulo Gallegos-winning The Green House (1965) and The Dream of the Celt (2010), other novels of Mario Vargas Llosa, also part of the plot occurs in Iquitos.

=== Entertainment and arts ===
Iquitos has an intense tourist movement in the entertainment, which is based on specific points located throughout the city. With a growing organization of entertainment today, the city has always had groups concerned to project the Iquitos arts such as dance, music, film, painting, literature and theater.

In the visual arts, the city is the birthplace of Amazonian pop art (also known wild naive) which is a unique, self-taught, pop-art style of the city, and is notable for its "sparkling" chromaticism, and makes a reference to hallucinogenic ayahuasca experiences. Originally, it is a mural art that blends prominently the colorful amazonian culture, European motifs and commercial characters, which may be influenced by American pop art, especially MTV.

In several works of painters iquiteños (such as Christian Bendayan, Roldán Pinedo, Elena Valera, Rember Yahuarcani, Brus Rubio and Victor Churay), Amazonian pop art legacy has been a visual reference to create avant-garde works of contemporary life in the city and Amazonian culture.

The Dirección Regional de Cultura (formerly known as Instituto Nacional de Cultura del Perú), with headquarters in the city, mainly funded events and arts festivals in the city, although there are also small indie or underground groups that conduct their own cultural events. The city has many small festivals; the highlights are Estamos en la Calle, Iquitos Outfest, and other small annual events.

The city is known for having a remarkable celebration, called simply Carnaval. During this festival, mainly pagan, celebrants are dedicated to wetting people with cabaciñas or other instrument. Many choose to be more extravagant, wetting with various substances such as paint or other object as cause for celebration. The celebration is unique each year in February. The carnival is heavily influenced by myths and rich Amazonian culture. It also celebrates the Day of San Juan, referring to John the Baptist as patron saint in the Peruvian Amazon, whose feast is celebrated on 24 June. The main element is the juane and other own dances as shunto jump.

==== Cinema ====
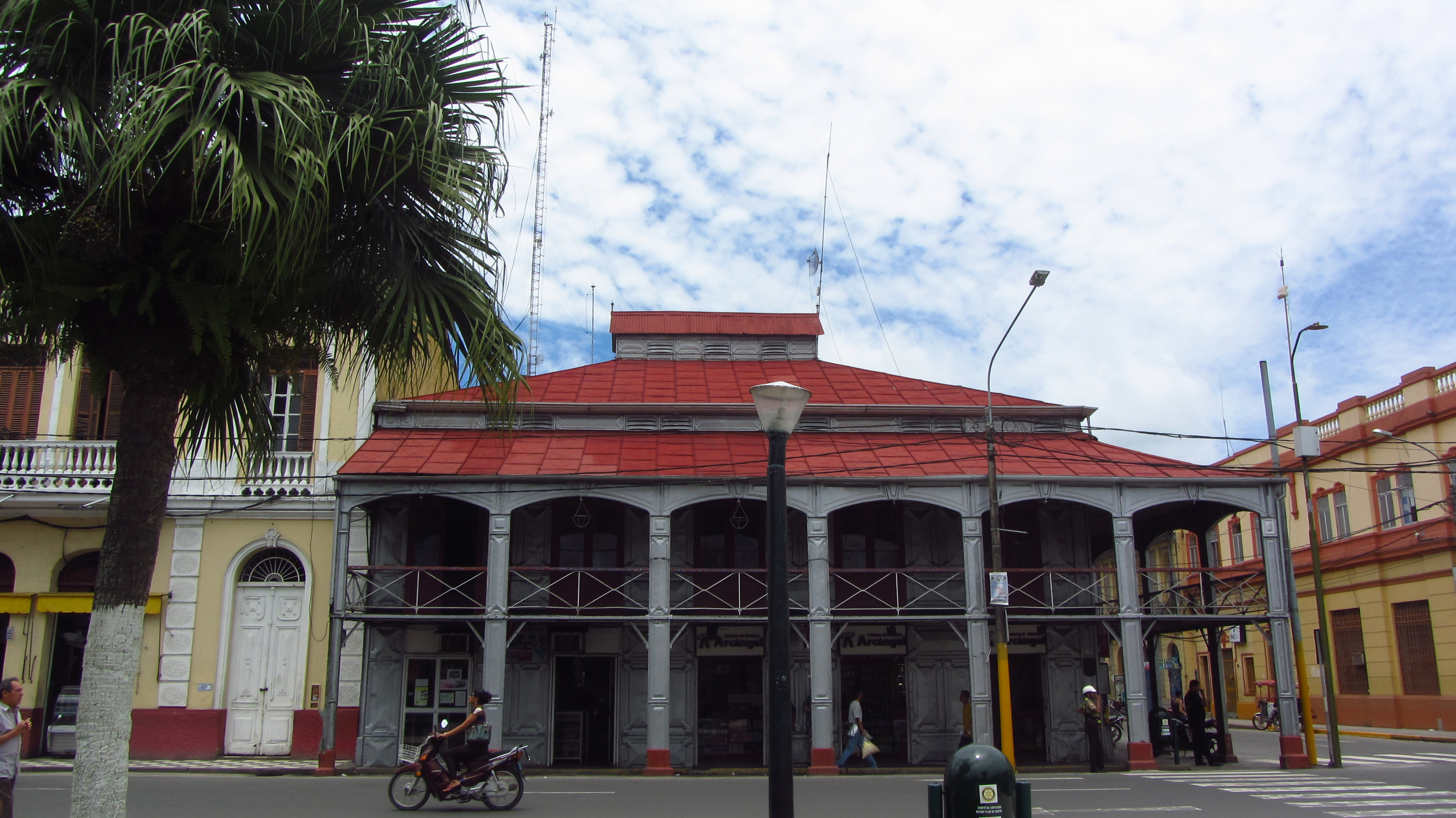
The first cinema was presented with an Edison machine at Casa de Fierro, 1900.

Iquitos has a major cinematic history, which originated from the arrival of foreign families during the rubber boom in the early 20th century. A group of people brought technology, including projectors of the Lumiere brothers. The most important pioneer of cinema in Iquitos and the Loreto Region is Antonio Wong Rengifo; alongside this, other filmmakers such as Werner Herzog, Armando Robles Godoy, Nora Izcue, Federico García, and Dorian Fernández-Moris prolonged the cinematic presence in the city. Iquitos was and is used as a cultural scene, reference, and shelter for many filmmakers.

Major films filmed in Iquitos and its surroundings are: Frente del Putumayo (1932) and Bajo el sol de Loreto (1936) by Antonio Wong Rengifo; No Stars in the Jungle (1966) and The Green Wall (1969) by Armando Robles Godoy; Aguirre, the Wrath of God (1972) and Fitzcarraldo (1982) by Werner Herzog; Informe sobre los shipibos (1974), Los hombres del Ucayali and Captain Pantoja and the Special Services (2000) by Francisco Lombardi, and General Cemetery (2012) by Dorián Fernández-Moris.

Despite having a long filmography, the film industry promoted the city is not too hard in his only commercial film theater. However, there is cultural and underground groups concerned with projecting films at festivals or private cinematheque as a way of cultural development. There is also small groups of self-taught filmmakers who record their own stories. The film genres with more presence are documentary, nature, drama, art house and, recently, horror and found footage in General Cemetery. At first, with Wong Rengifo, was shot slice-of-life/documentary films

=== Tourism ===
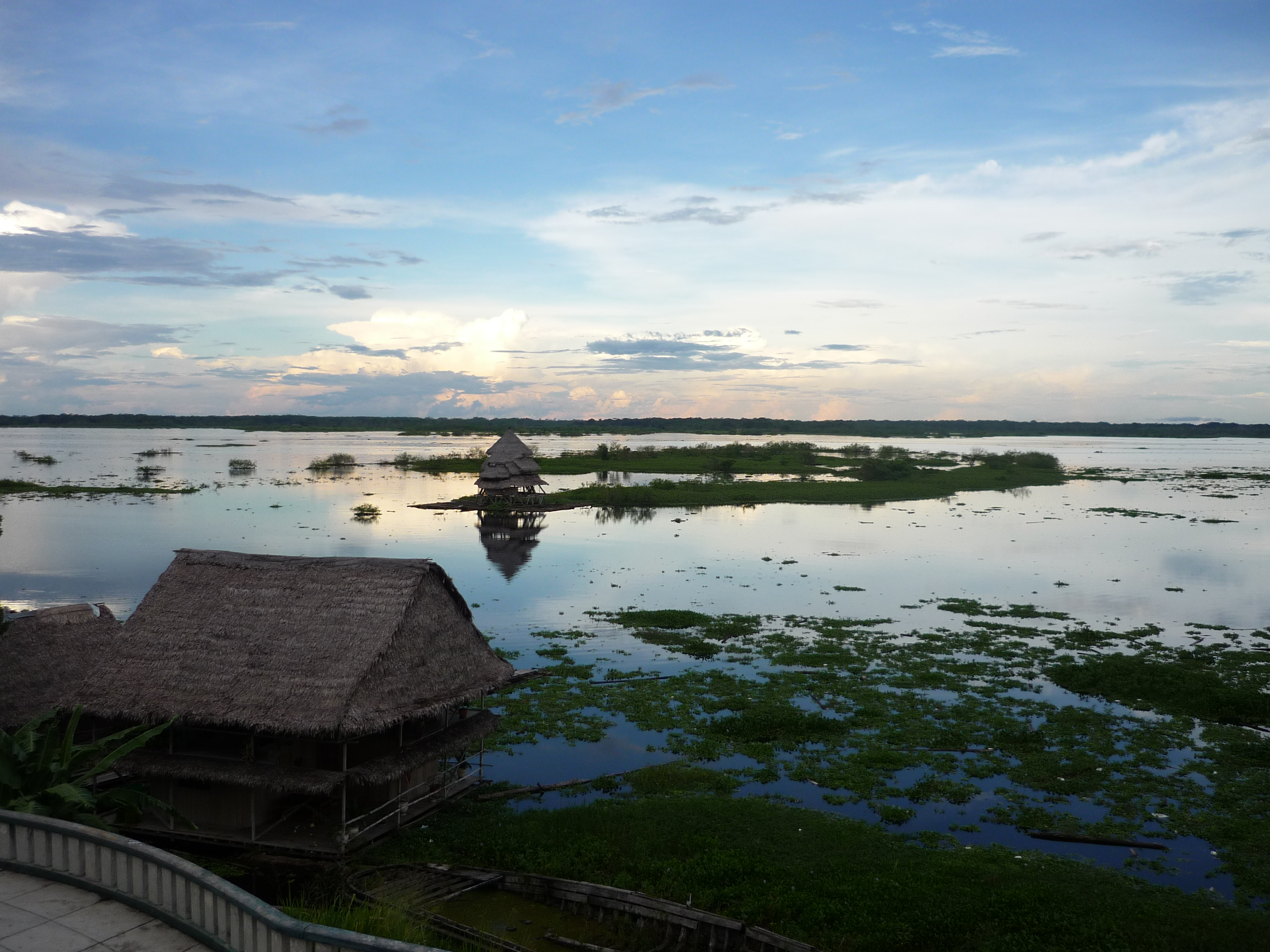
signature Amazonian horizon surrounding the city

Tourism is one of the most vital industries in Iquitos, which has a growing reputation as a honeypot due to its location on the banks of the Amazon River, one of the seven natural wonders of the world. Through the years, Iquitos receives a considerable number of foreigners; the tourist index grew by international flights offered by the city's airport. Tourism in the city formed into European-style architecture, cuisine, drinks, art, culture, worldview, Spanish accent and historical references of Loreto. Iquitos has adequate infrastructure to accommodate tourists from all levels. It has a 5-star hotel, many of 3-, 2-, and 1-star rating.

The major tourist attractions include Barrio de Belén, Plaza de Armas, Casa de Fierro, Ex Hotel Palace, Iglesia Matriz de Iquitos, Allpahuayo Mishana; Embarcadero Bellavista-Nanay, ethnic communities located around the city, Quistococha Resort and Zoo; Mercado Artesanal of San Juan. iperú is the leading tourist guide service that is offered to tourists at the airport and the city center of the city.

The city is also home to unique tourist companies as Amazonia Expeditions, Maniti Camp Expeditions, Otorongo Expeditions, Amazon Golf Course, and Project Amazonas (dedicated to research and conservation). Special experiences outside the key tourist areas of the city include the Camiri —a floating hotel—, the Isla de los Monos, the Pilpintuwasi butterfly zoo, Iquitos-Sunkaruqucha Corrientillos-King Kong-Nina Rumi circuit, and adjoining districts such as Mazán, Indiana and Bellavista

In 2010, Iquitos received about 150 thousand tourists. The following year, in 2011, the index fell to 46,000 tourist foreigners, which expects 10% rise rapidly in 2013 with international flights opened in July 2012 and the Amazon River as a natural wonder.

==== Spiritual tourism ====
Ayahuasca is known as a major cultural landmark, and mystic tourism has increased in Iquitos in recent years. The drink, made from the vine Banisteriopsis caapi, is investigated by the Western people with a medicinal purpose and study, and was named the nation's cultural heritage.

Dangers, however, still exist when coming into contact with the drug. Shamans are not regulated and none have proof of credentials. While deaths in Iquitos are rare, they have been reported, including Frenchman Fabrice Champion and American Kyle Nolan.

Iquitos was home to the annual Amazonian Shamanism Conference, which discussed practices surrounding psychedelic plants, including Ayahuasca.

=== Amazon commemorative capital ===
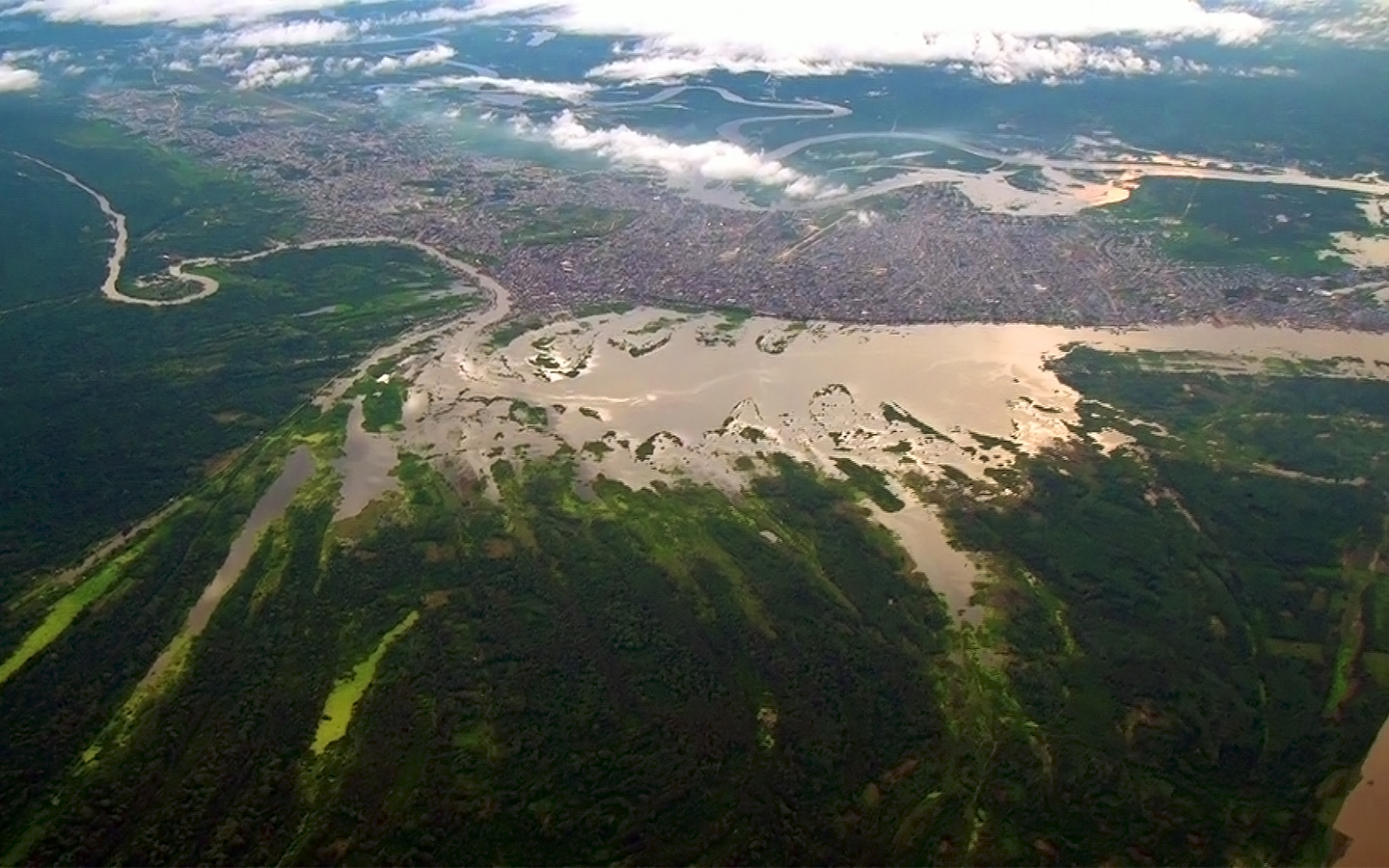
Aerial view of Iquitos

Iquitos is home to the 120 kilograms (260 lb), bronze commemorative plaque of the Amazon River basin as one of the seven natural wonders of the world, which was granted on 13 August 2012 by Fernand Weber, founder of New7Wonders. The distinction is shared with Bolivia, Brazil, Ecuador, Suriname, Colombia, Venezuela and French Guiana, however, recognition was given to Peru which originally ran for the Amazon through the Regional Government of Loreto based in Iquitos.

The awards show was held in Iquitos. It began with a massive parade along Avenida Quiñonez, and eventually culminated in the main day, 13 August, divided into two sessions throughout the day: the first in the confluence of the Itaya and Nanay in the afternoon, and the second on 28 July Square of the city at night. The event received intense international attention. Similar to Machu Picchu as a wonder of the world, Iquitos, as the main entrance to the Amazon, expects great tourist revenue.

The President of Peru Ollanta Humala, next to the First Lady Nadine Heredia and Loreto Regional President Ivan Vasquez received the award. Jean Paul de la Fuente, New7Wonders foundation director, said positively on the image of Iquitos:

Clearly there will be economic and tourism impacts. The examples we have of other places are growths of 10, 20 and 30 percent annually

— Jean Paul de la Fuente

However, despite the great satisfaction, the award caused polarized reactions indicating that the Regional Government of Loreto would be on duty to plan better urban development in Iquitos for the forecasted intense tourism. The negative scrutiny aimed at disorganized and massive sewer construction was damaging the city streets, causing discomfort and accidents in traffic and littering the aesthetic image of Iquitos. Several iquiteños citizens criticized it via Twitter.

=== Language ===
Iquitos is also attractive for its Amazonic Spanish, a dialect of Spanish spoken in the Amazon. The dialect is more noticeable in speech than it is in writing, such as [f] and [x] are allophones, (e.g., Juana is pronounced /fana/), especially when it is next to one or semivowel. (Los fríos de San Juan; Los fríos de San Fän), the double preposing and possessive genitive (De Antonio sus amigos; From Antonio his friends), and the preemption of articles against the names (Juana, Lä Fuana). There are also other languages spoken as Iquito, Yagua, Ese Ejja, or other native languages in Loreto, and foreign languages like English and French because of increasing globalization.

=== Cuisine ===
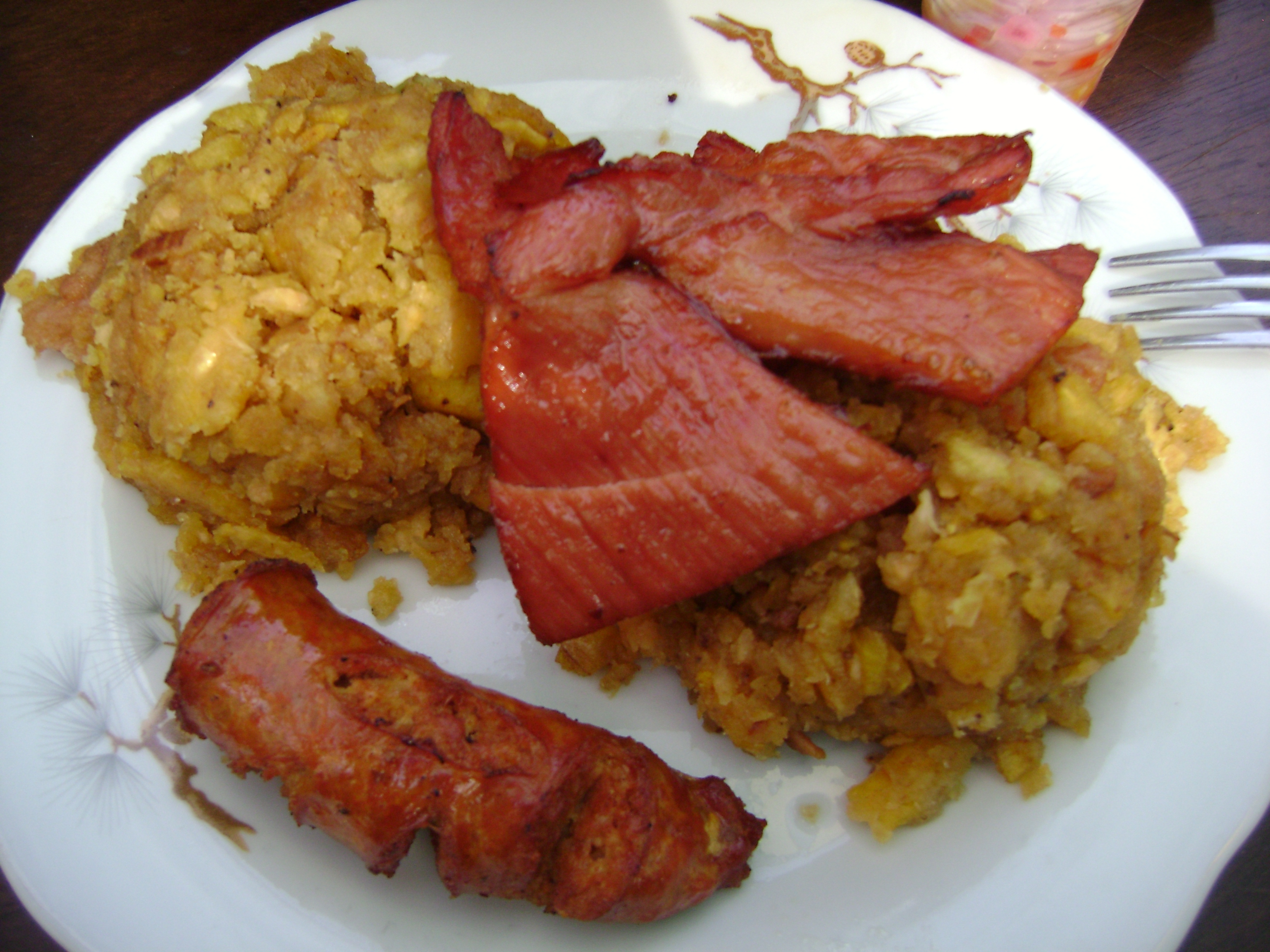
Tacacho with chorizo

Juane is one of the main dishes of cuisine of the Peruvian jungle. It is widely consumed during the Catholic Feast of San Juan (St. John), held on 24 June each year. The dish was named in honor of San Juan Bautista. The dish could have a pre-Columbian origin. With the arrival of the Spanish, missionaries popularized the Biblical story of Salome, John, and Herodias. Some believe the dish's name comes from the reference to the head of San Juan.

Another popular dish is Tacacho, made from fried slices of plaintain mashed with chicharrones (fried pork fat). It is usually accompanied with chorizo (fried sausage) making it a savory combination. The dish is typical of Iquitos as well as the Peruvian Amazon. It is widespread in the rest of the country. The term tacacho derives from the Quechua term, taka chu, which means beaten. Tacacho consumption varies depending on the region where it is made. In Madre de Dios and San Martín, many people eat tacachos for breakfast, while in other regions, it is a dish served at lunch or dinner. In the San Martín region, tacacho is included in the Christmas dinner. In the Amazon region of Ecuador, the dish is known as bolon. It has a counterpart in the Caribbean islands, where it is called mofongo.

== Sport ==
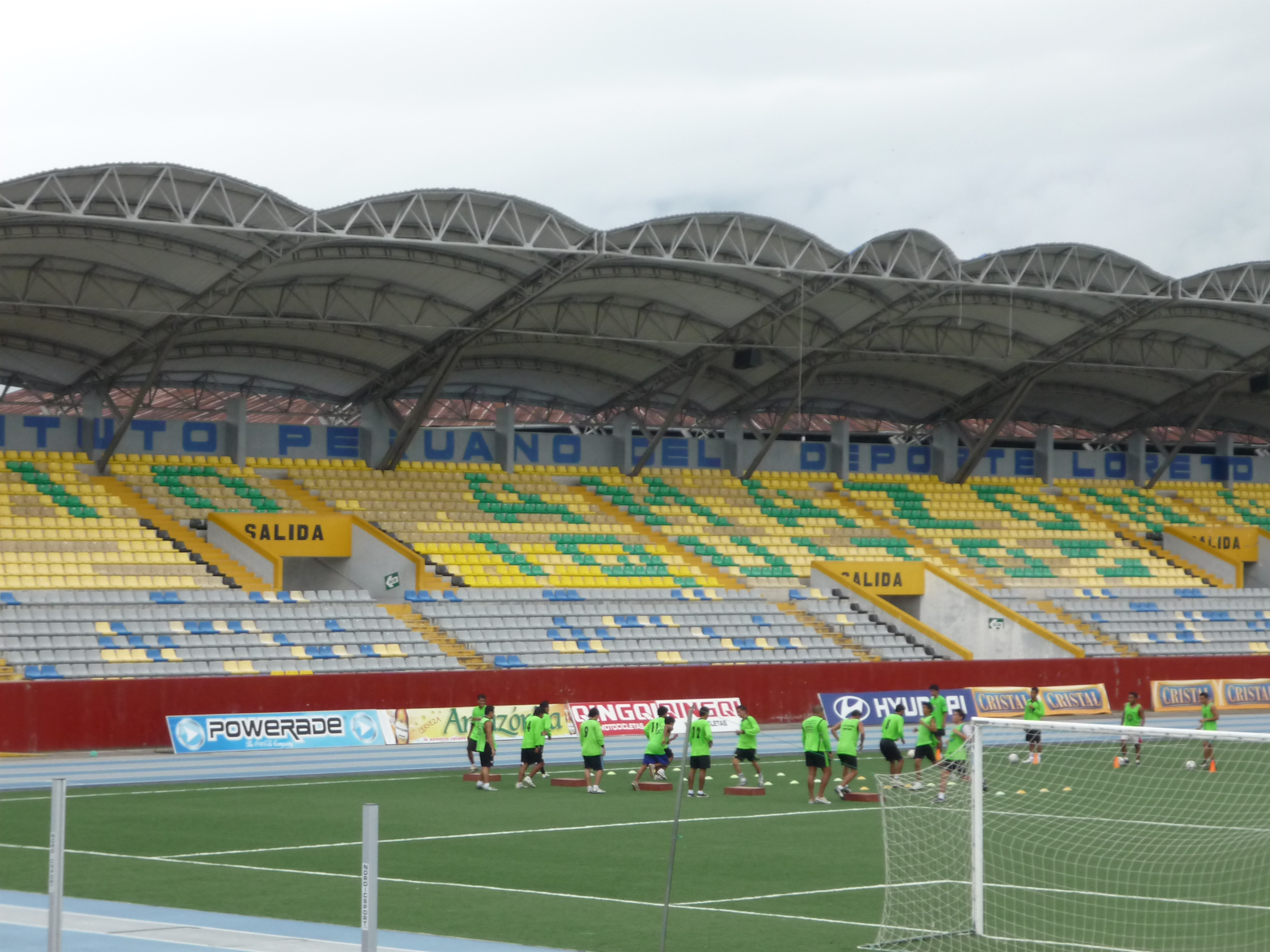
Max Agustin Stadium

Association football is the most popular sport in Iquitos. Colegio Nacional de Iquitos is one of the largest and most historic of the city, however, it has been rivaled by AD Comerciantes FC who has succeed them in recent years. In 2005 the city's football community received the FIFA Fair Play Award as a result of being one of the five host cities for the 2005 FIFA U-17 World Championship. Estadio Max Augustín is the largest stadium in Iquitos, with a capacity of 24,576. The Coliseo Juan Pinasco Villanueva, located next to the stadium, is the city's main arena. It hosts futsal, handball, volleyball, basketball and boxing matches. Golf is also a popular sport, with the Amazon Golf Course being the main course. Rugby is more popular in Iquitos than in the rest of Peru, and has formed a Rugby Union League in 2012.

The Carrera Internacional de Balsas is an international boating race hosted in Iquitos since 1994. It is the longest boat race in the world, with a length of 180 kilometers.

== Transport ==
=== Road ===
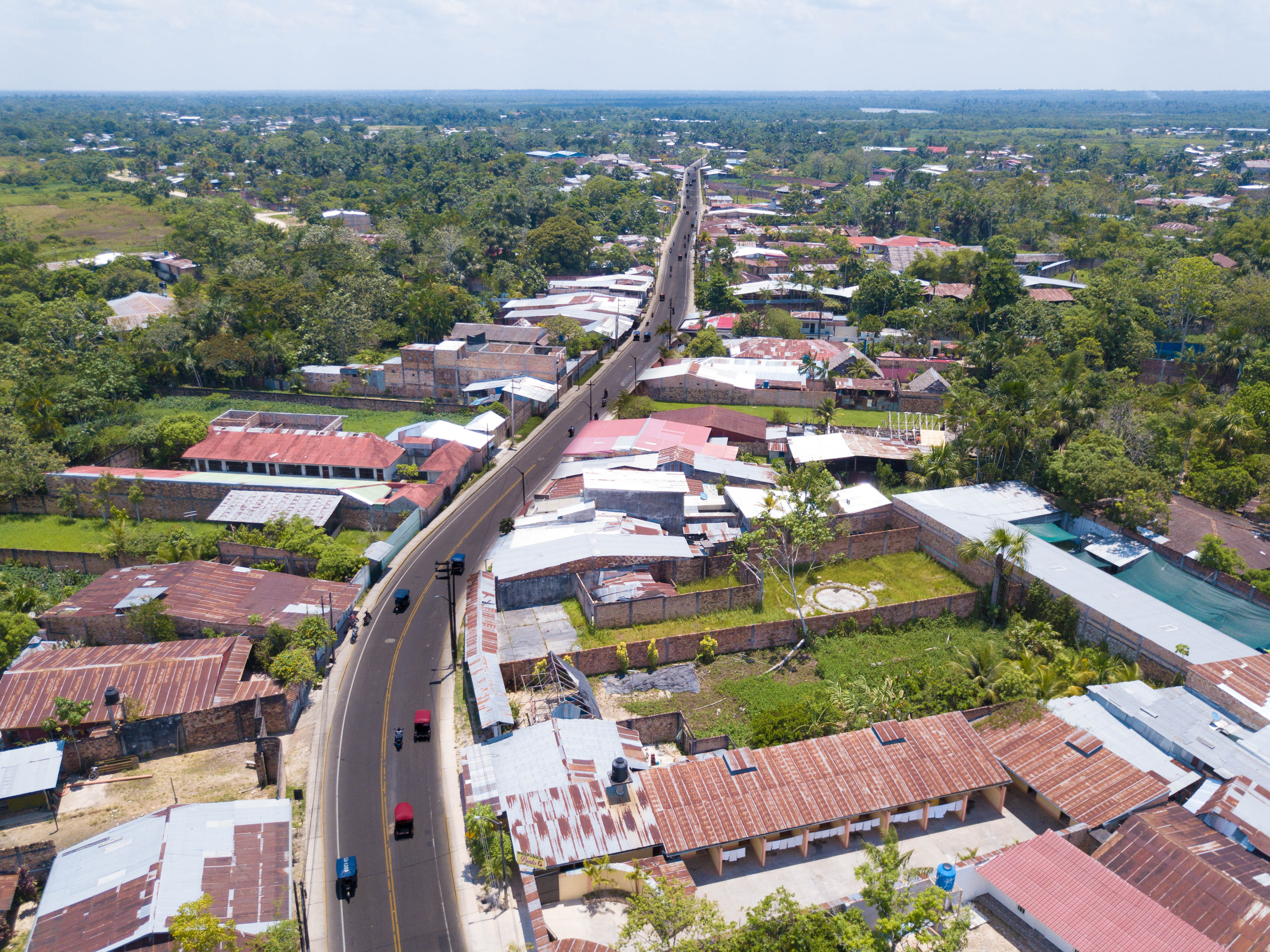
Santa Clara highway, completed in 2018

Iquitos has a personality very different from the rest of Peru and even different from other South-American Amazonian cities. The streets of Iquitos are dominated by more than 25,000 auto rickshaws or motokars, known in the rest of Peru under the name of mototaxi, and for foreigners as auto rickshaw or tuk-tuk, providing taxi service. The buses are large vehicles made of wood with direct routes.

=== Maritime ===
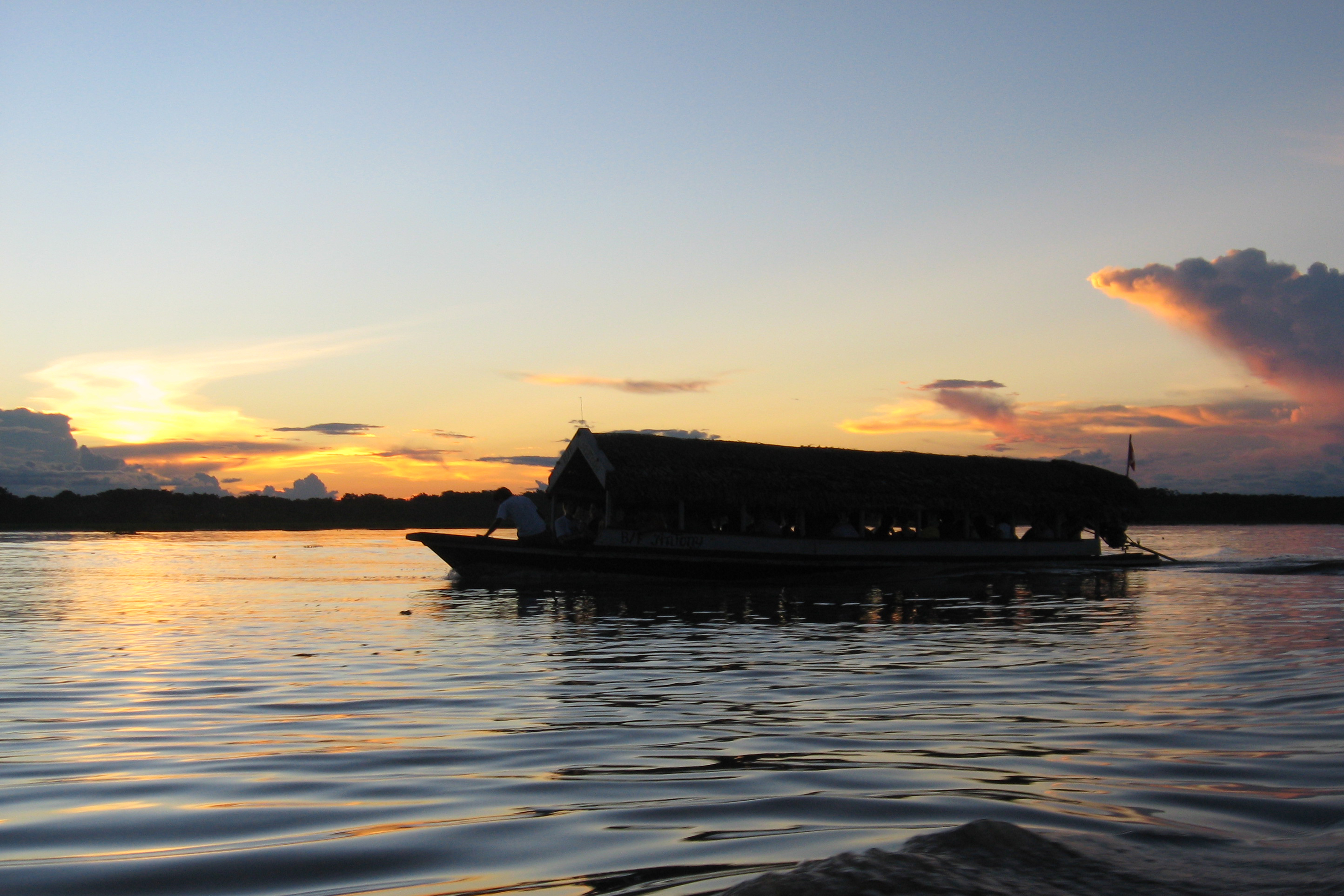
Boat transport

Iquitos is widely regarded as the largest inland city that is inaccessible by road. Air and river transport are the main means for entry or exit of people and goods to the city, and thus the cost of living in this city is generally higher than the Peruvian standard. Iquitos is considered the second most expensive city in Peru after Cusco. A proposed road link to Sarameriza, to be completed by 2021, would connect Iquitos to the country's road network.

=== Air ===
The city has renewed Crnl. FAP Francisco Secada Vignetta International Airport where domestic and international flights operate. In the domestic terminal there are routes from Lima and other Peruvian provinces. While in the international terminal there are flights from/to Panama City on Wednesdays and Saturdays with Copa Airlines also connecting from/to USA, Mexico, Canada, Central America & Caribbean, Colombia, Ecuador, Venezuela and Brazil. There are between 8 and 9 daily flights to Iquitos from Lima, some make intermediate stops in Pucallpa and Tarapoto. Air routes are served by four companies: LAN Perú, Peruvian Airlines, Star Perú and Copa Airlines. The direct flight between Lima and Iquitos takes 1 hour and 45 minutes. Copa Airlines provides international flights to the city with Panama and the Americas from 14 July 2012. Since June 2011, the Central Government of Peru provided two de Havilland Canada DHC-6 Twin Otter for operations across the region.

== Consular representation ==
Brazil has a Vice-consulate in Iquitos.

== Twin towns ==
- Elbasan, Albania
- Lafayette, Colorado, United States
- Leticia, Colombia
- Manaus, Brazil

== In popular culture ==
- Mario Vargas Llosa's 1973 novel Captain Pantoja and the Special Service is set in Iquitos.
- The movie Fitzcarraldo (1982), directed by Werner Herzog, was filmed near Iquitos. The film was inspired by the rubber baron Carlos Fitzcarrald.
- Madventures (2002) visited the town of Iquitos during their travels.
- The documentary The Fire Within: Jews in the Amazonian Rainforest (2008) tells the story of the Moroccan Jews, their Peruvian wives and descendants in Iquitos, and the late-20th century study and conversion by a number of the community to Judaism, followed by their migration to Israel.
- The documentary El Rio by Juan Carlos Galeano and the surrounding indigenous communities.

== Notable people from Iquitos ==
- Clotilde Arias, State Department authorized translation of the "Star Spangled Banner" presently exhibited at the Smithsonian Institution National Museum of American History (1901–1959)
- César Calvo de Araujo, writer and painter, born in Yurimaguas near Iquitos (1910–1970).
- Carlos Fitzcarrald, entrepreneur and rubber baron active in Iquitos (1862–1897).
- Julio César Arana, born in Rioja, he was an entrepreneur, rubber baron, mayor of Iquitos between 1902-1903, founder of the Peruvian Amazon Company which operated from Iquitos, and later Senator of Loreto (1864-1952).
- Ofelia Montesco, actress renowned for work in Mexican cinema (1936–1983).
- Fanny Casado, scientist specializing in toxicology and bioengineering at the Pontifical Catholic University of Peru.

== See also ==
- Iperu, tourist information and assistance
- Iquitos Satellite Laboratory (IQTLAB)
- Tourism in Peru
- Punchana
- Rainforest
- Walk of the Amazon Heroes
