= Rosa Panduro District =

Rosa Panduro District Distrito de Rosa Panduro
- District
- Location of Rosa Panduro in the Putumayo Province
- Coordinates: 1°47′47″S 73°24′28″W
- Country: Peru
- Region: Loreto
- Province: Putumayo
- Created: April 10, 2014
- Capital: Santa Mercedes
- Subdivisions: 1 populated center

Government
  - Mayor: Nicer Vargas Garcia (2019-2022)

Area
  - Total: 7,166.65 km^{2} (2,767.06 sq mi)
- Elevation: 34 m (112 ft)

Population (2017)
  - Total: 520
  - Density: 0.073/km^{2} (0.19/sq mi)
- Time zone: UTC-5 (PET)
- UBIGEO: 160802
- Website: www.munirosapanduro.gob.pe

Rosa Panduro District is a district of the Putumayo Province in Peru, and one of the four districts that comprise that province.

== History ==
Rosa Panduro was part of Maynas Province until April 17, 2014 when it was created as District by Law N° 30186 as part of Putumayo Province. The district is named after a housewife who participated in the Ecuadorian–Peruvian War.

== Geography ==
The district has a total land area of 7,155,65 km^{2}. Its administrative center is located 34 meters above sea level.

=== Boundaries ===
- By the north: Teniente Manuel Clavero District;
- By the est: Colombia Republic;
- By the south and sudwest: Putumayo District and, Napo District and Torres Causana District (Maynas Province).

== Authorities ==
The current mayor of the district is Delmer Ricopa Coquinche (Movimiento Integración Loretana).

== See also ==
- Administrative divisions of Peru
