= Yagua =

Ethnic group

Coordinates: 04°13′N 69°56′W

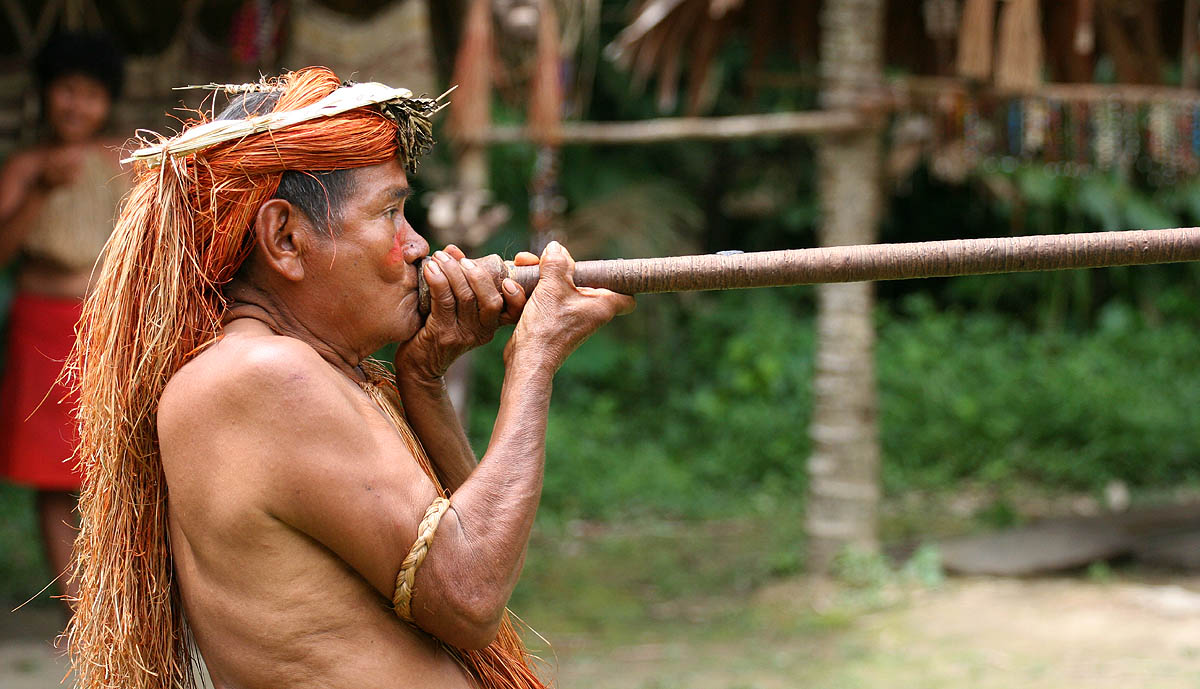
- Yagua man demonstrating the use of a punaca at one of the Amazonian islands near Iquitos

Total population
- 6,000 (2000)

Regions with significant populations
- Colombia, Peru

Languages
- Yagua, Spanish

Religion
- traditional tribal religion, Christianity

Related ethnic groups
- Yameo people

Yagua are an indigenous people in Colombia and northeastern Peru, numbering approximately 6,000. Currently, they live near the Amazon, Napo, Putumayo and Yavari rivers and their tributaries. As of 2005, some Yagua have migrated northward to Colombia, near the town of Leticia.

== Location ==
Currently the Yagua live in some 30 communities scattered throughout a section of the Peruvian and Colombian Amazon basin which can roughly be described as a rectangle 200 miles wide and 350 miles long (70,000 sq. miles) extending southward from the second to the fifth parallel and westward from the 70th to the 75th meridian west.

== Language ==
The Yagua language is classified as a Peba-Yaguan language. The only closely related languages that have been documented are Peba and Yameo both of which are now extinct.

2000 Yagua people in Peru were monolingual in 2000, and of these, 75% were women and 25% were men. The majority of the rest are bilingual in Spanish to varying degrees.

== Name ==
Yagua people are also known as Llagua, Nijyamïï Nikyejaada, Yahua, Yava, and Yegua.

There are two possible etymologies for the term 'Yagua', both of which originate outside the Yagua language. First, the Quechua term yawar meaning 'blood' or 'the color of blood', is a likely possibility due to the Yagua custom of painting their faces with achiote, the blood red seeds of the annatto plant (Bixa orellana).

During the pre-conquest period, the Yaguas could have been in sporadic contact with the Incas, as to this day there are far more Quechua (language spoken by the Inca) words in Yagua than there are Spanish words, another hypothesis points out that Spanish missionaries imposed Quechua as the common language, a customary practice during most of the colony. The term in Quechua would have been something like yawar runa, 'the blood-red people', which could easily have been assimilated into Spanish as yagua.

Second, the term yagua in Spanish means 'royal palm'. This term could have been applied to the Yaguas by the Spanish explorers because much of the native clothing is made of palm fiber. There is no data on whether a name resembling yagua was first used by the Quechuas of the area or the Spanish, therefore there is no principled way to distinguish between these two possible etymologies.

The only native term that might be thought of as a self-referent is nijyąąmíy 'people.' This word is often used in contrast with mááy 'white people' and munuñúmiy 'savages', 'enemies' or 'non-Yaguas'. However, nijyąąmíy is also the generic term for all human beings.

== History ==
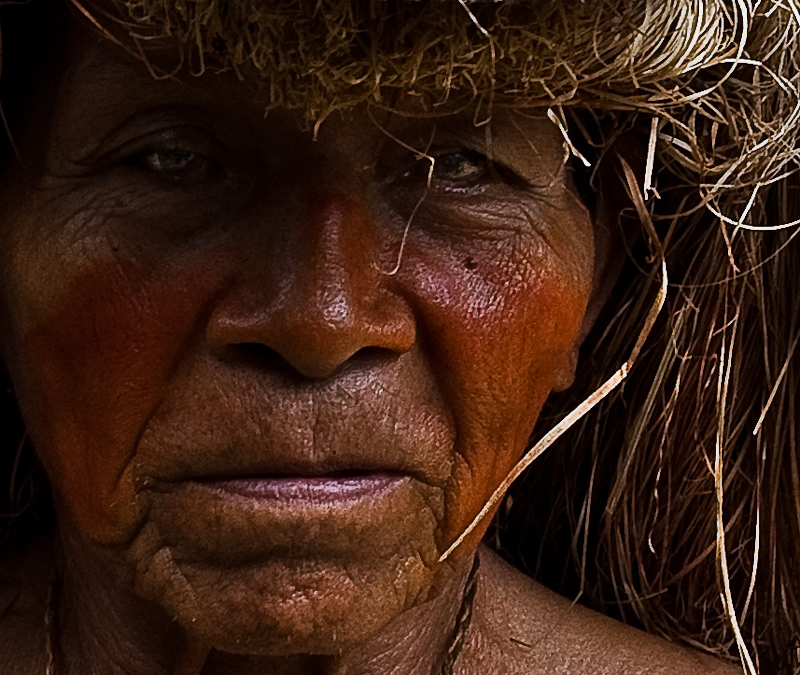
A Yagua elder near Iquitos, Peru

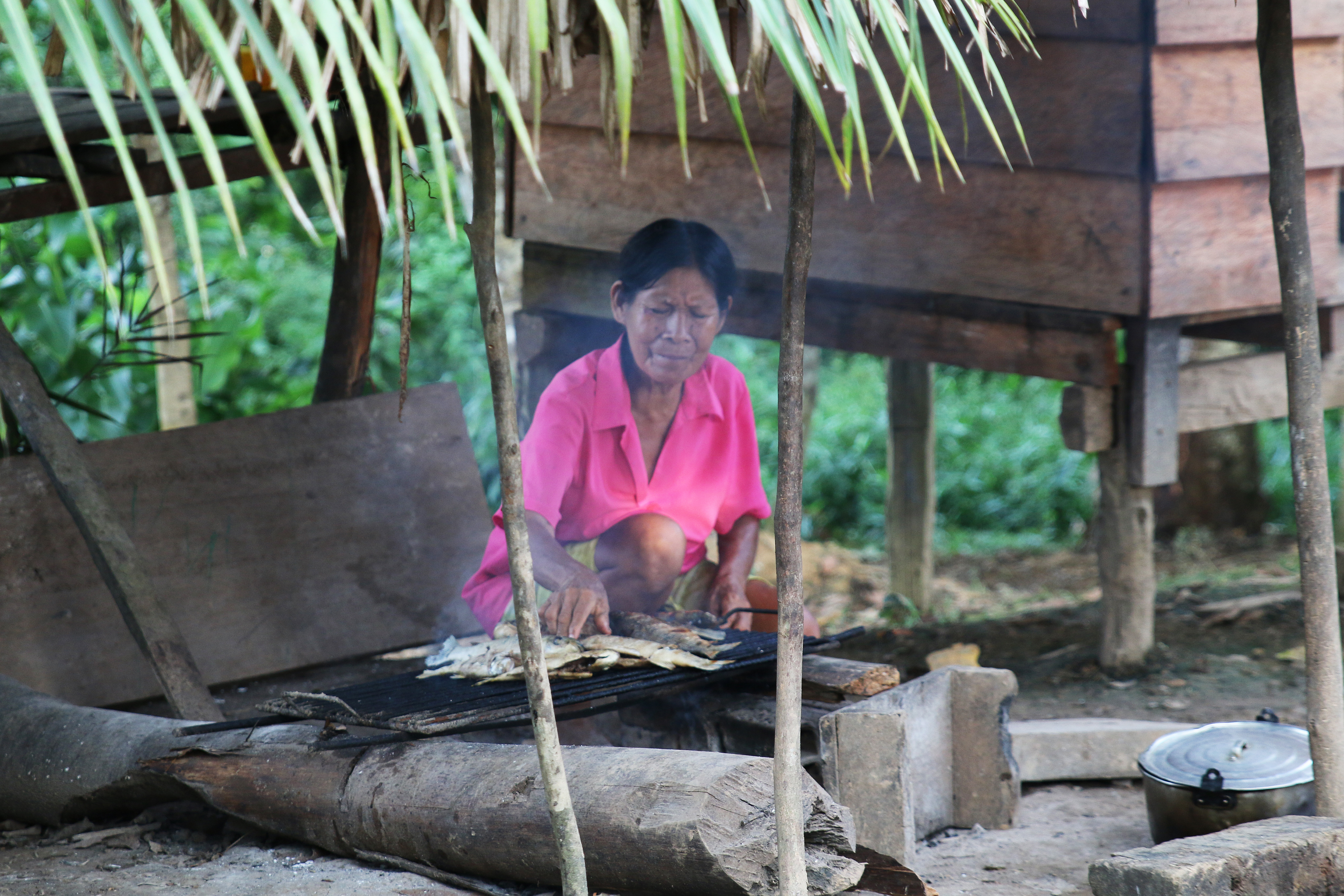
Yagua woman preparing fish for dinner, Libertad (Colombia)

The third earliest documented European contact with the Yagua was probably made by the Spanish explorer Francisco de Orellana in January 1542. While exploring in the area of modern-day Pebas, Orellana encountered a village called Aparia, and captured two chiefs named Aparia and Dirimara, as well as some others. These names could conceivably have come from the Yagua words (j)ápiiryá 'red macaw clan' and rimyurá 'shaman' respectively. The former could very well be a village name as well as a name applied to an individual; today clan names are still used by many Yaguas as family names. The word for shaman might also be used to refer to an individual, especially one singled out as a 'chief'. Regular European contact began in 1686 with the establishment of a Jesuit mission at San Joaquin de los Omagua, on an island in the Amazon river probably near what is now the mouth of the Ampiyacu River. Though this mission was established to serve the Cambeba people, there was undoubtedly contact with the Yaguas as well. From the 17th century to the last half of the 19th century, contact with the Yaguas was mainly through the Jesuit and Franciscan missionaries. In the early 18th century, Portuguese raiding parties attacked the Spanish missions throughout the Amazon region causing much geographic dispersion of the tribes that were in contact with the Spanish, and inflicting severe casualties.

The present extreme geographic dispersion of the Yagua, however, is due largely to the effects of the 'rubber boom' in the late 19th and early 20th centuries. At that time Europeans arrived in large numbers from Brazil and began to exploit the indigenous people to extract natural latex from the jungle. Many Yaguas died in conflicts with these Europeans, as well as by exposure to European diseases. Others were exploited as slave labor. Still others fled to remote regions of the jungle. Ever since the rubber boom, the Yagua sense of unity and of common culture has declined.

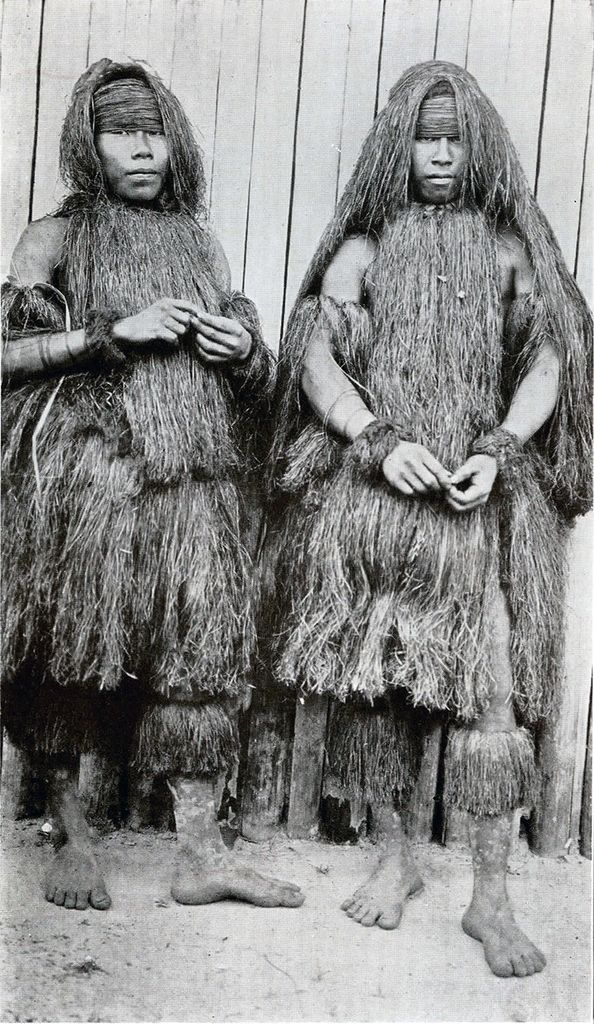
“Yahua men in grass clothing, Pebas, Peru.”

Ethnographic descriptions of the Yagua are found in Fejos (1943) and P. Powlison (1985). The history and migrations of the Yagua are described in Chaumeil (1983).

Yagua mythology was often told at night when they were not conducive to sleep along with them not being preoccupied with other matters. Most of their stories started with "My deceased father (mother, grandfather, grandmother etc.) used to tell me," to make the stories more real.

== Sociology ==
The tremendous distances between villages make it very difficult to have consistent interaction with Yaguas outside one's home village. All economic activity outside the village is with non-Yagua peoples, usually Spanish-speakers. Thus there is economic and social pressure to learn Spanish and assimilate to the general Peruvian culture. Villages are also characteristically quite small (2 to 30 families). This fact further limits the breadth of interaction with other Yaguas, and increases the tendency to want to reach out beyond one's village for social and economic advantages.

However, the Yagua culture and language do continue to be viable, especially in some of the larger and more isolated communities. Some children grow up speaking only Yagua, and native arts and crafts are a significant economic activity.
