= Bajo Putumayo Yaguas Communal Reserve =

Protected area in the Loreto Region of northeastern Peru

- Reserva Comunal Bajo Putumayo Yaguas
- IUCN category VI (protected area with sustainable use of natural resources)
- Location within Peru
- Location: Putumayo Province, Loreto Region, Peru
- Coordinates: 2°31′11″S 70°45′59″W
- Area: 1,606.04 km^{2} (620.10 sq mi)
- Established: September 26, 2025
- Governing body: SERNANP

The Bajo Putumayo Yaguas Communal Reserve (Spanish: Reserva Comunal Bajo Putumayo Yaguas) is a protected area located in the Putumayo Province of the Loreto Region, Peru. It was created on 26 September 2025 by Supreme Decree No. 020-2025-MINAM, covering an area of about 1,606.04 km² of Amazonian forest near the border with Colombia. The communal reserve is co-managed by SERNANP and an Administrative Contract Executor (ECA) representing the Bora, Ocaina, Kichwa, Murui-Muinani, Yagua, and Ticuna peoples.

The reserve aims to conserve four ecosystems and two Amazonian ecoregions that host 4,554 species of flora and fauna, including 70 threatened species. The area shelters around 65% of Peru's freshwater fish species and 32% of its recorded mammals.

== See also ==
- Güeppí-Sekime National Park
- Airo Pai Communal Reserve
- Huimeki Communal Reserve
