= Puerto Arica (Maynas) =

Puerto Arica Puerto Arica
- Town
- Flag Seal
- Nickname: The city of the survivors (Spanish: La ciudad de los sobrevivientes)
- Location within Peru
- Coordinates: 2°38′10″S 73°29′56″W
- Country: Peru
- Department: Loreto
- Province: Maynas
- District: Napo

Puerto Arica is a Peruvian town, belonging to the province of Maynas in the Loreto region, on the banks of the Napo River, in northwestern Peru.

== History ==
The city of Arica used to be located in southern Peru, in the province of the same name, in the Moquegua Department. During the War of the Pacific, Chilean troops invaded the town, and took it from Peruvian control, after which the Treaty of Ancón was signed, granting a large amount of Peruvian territory to Chile, with Arica becoming a commune of the Department of the same name, within the new Province of Tacna. After the Treaty of Lima, the territory was unconditionally given to Chile.

The refugees who left or were expelled from the region by Chilean forces were then sent by the Peruvian government to the Loreto region in order to populate the area. Those from Tarapacá settled in what would become Nuevo Tarapacá, in Maynas Province, and those from Arica settled in what would become Puerto Arica, in northern Loreto. After the Salomón–Lozano Treaty, the area was ceded to Colombia, and the original settlers moved south to Maynas Province in eastern Loreto.

=== Symbols ===
The town uses the same flag and same coat of arms as the Chilean city of Arica.

== Transportation ==
Virtually all transport takes place in the Napo river, which connects it to nearby Mazán, Indiana, and Santa Clotilde. There's also a road that connects it to nearby Flor de Agosto, located 50 minutes away from the town, in the border with Colombia.

== Religion ==
Christianity is predominant, with evangelics as the majority, followed by Catholics, and a small number of Jews, indigenous religions, as well as the Evangelical Association of the Israelite Mission of the New Universal Covenant.

== See also ==
- Puerto Arica
- Arica
