= Yameo language =

Extinct Peba–Yaguan language of Peru

Yameo
- Native to: Peru
- Region: Department of Loreto
- Ethnicity: Yameo
- Extinct: after 1964
- Language family: Peba–Yaguan: Yameo

Language codes
- ISO 639-3: yme
- Glottolog: yame1242
- ELP: Yaméo
- Yameo is classified as Extinct by the UNESCO Atlas of the World's Languages in Danger.

Yameo is an extinct language of the Peba–Yaguan language family formerly spoken along the banks of the Amazon River from the Tigre River to the Nanay River in Peru.

== Name ==
Günter Tessmann (1930) reports the Yameo called themselves yameo, a term of uncertain origin, though Lucas Espinoza Pérez (1955) reported that this term was no longer in use in San Francisco de Regis, its residents referring to themselves as san reginos, but some people remembered the name yameo. Masamae (Mazán, Parara), spoken around the Mazán River in Loreto Department, Peru, is a variety of Yameo.

== Geographical distribution ==
The Yameo were distributed between the lower Tigre and Napo Rivers. The Yameo lived in forests and ravines surrounding the smaller Curaray, Mazan, Nahuapo, Nanay, and Itaya Rivers. To their west were the Itucale, who spoke the language isolate Urarina; to their north were the Zaparoan-speaking Semigae, Zaparo, and Iquito; to their east were the Payagua, Matsés, and further some Peban groups, including the Caumari; finally, to their south were the Cocama and Omagua.

== Dialects ==
John Alden Mason (1950) subdivides Yameo into the Napeano, Masamai, Nahuapo, Amaona, Mikeano, Parrano, Yarrapo, Alabono, San Regino (?), Mazan (?), and Camuchivo (?) groups.

== History ==
The Yameo people were first missionized briefly in 1682 and 1700, and were "more successfully converted" in 1729. By 1925, the Yameo language had been reduced to three speakers, according to Tessmann, the rest having adopted Cocama, Quechua, or Spanish. Čestmír Loukotka (1968) reports, however, that the language was still being spoken as of 1964.

=== Documentation ===
Yameo is known primarily through Espinoza (1950), the only grammatical study of the language. Tessmann also published a short vocabulary of Yameo in 1930. A number of religious texts from the old missions also exist.

== Classification ==
Yameo was classified as one of the 16 "matrix" languages by Lorenzo Hervás, who gave dialects as Amaono, Nahuapo, Napeano, and Masamae; according to him, his "matrix" languages have little in common. Daniel Garrison Brinton grouped a number of Yameo subgroups in his "Lama" stock, which he did not group with any other. The first to propose a relationship linking Yameo to the related Peba and Yagua languages was Paul Rivet (1911), joining Brinton's "Lama" and "Peba" stocks, the latter composed of various Peba subgroups and Yagua. This classification was followed by other authors, some of whom attempted to group the Peba–Yaguan languages with the Cariban language family, either within it or related to it in a Macro-Carib phylum.

== Phonology ==
Yameo is analyzed as having the following phonology:

=== Consonants ===
Yameo consonants
	Bilabial	Alveolar	Postalveolar	Palatal	Velar
Stop	p	t			k
Fricative		s	ʃ		
Nasal	m	n			
Approximant				j	w
Lateral		(l)			

Yameo may have distinguished between a rhotic tap and trill. Espinoza also mentions [ʎ], though it is insufficiently attested to analyze its phonemic status.

=== Vowels ===
Five vowels are proposed for Yameo:

	Front	Central	Back
High	i		u
Mid	e		o
Low		a	

== Sample text ==
The following is a translation of the Lord's Prayer in Yameo:

Neinque Ahen, arrecuima becin, termo atiahua, reanaita hoe : habecia nemini : antonein arrecuima hebaceyala renenea tirra. Arrecuima renenea naerra ninle iñopoponenninle. — Nein ami ciarahun hataincio nein errema halayan nein, nèinhuchanla tirra nein halayan, lobua remornecio nein, lara hamuera nein; nein enlayalala, huchanen, taenreala ninci, haramatin nein.
