= Víctor Pantoja =

Peruvian corporal

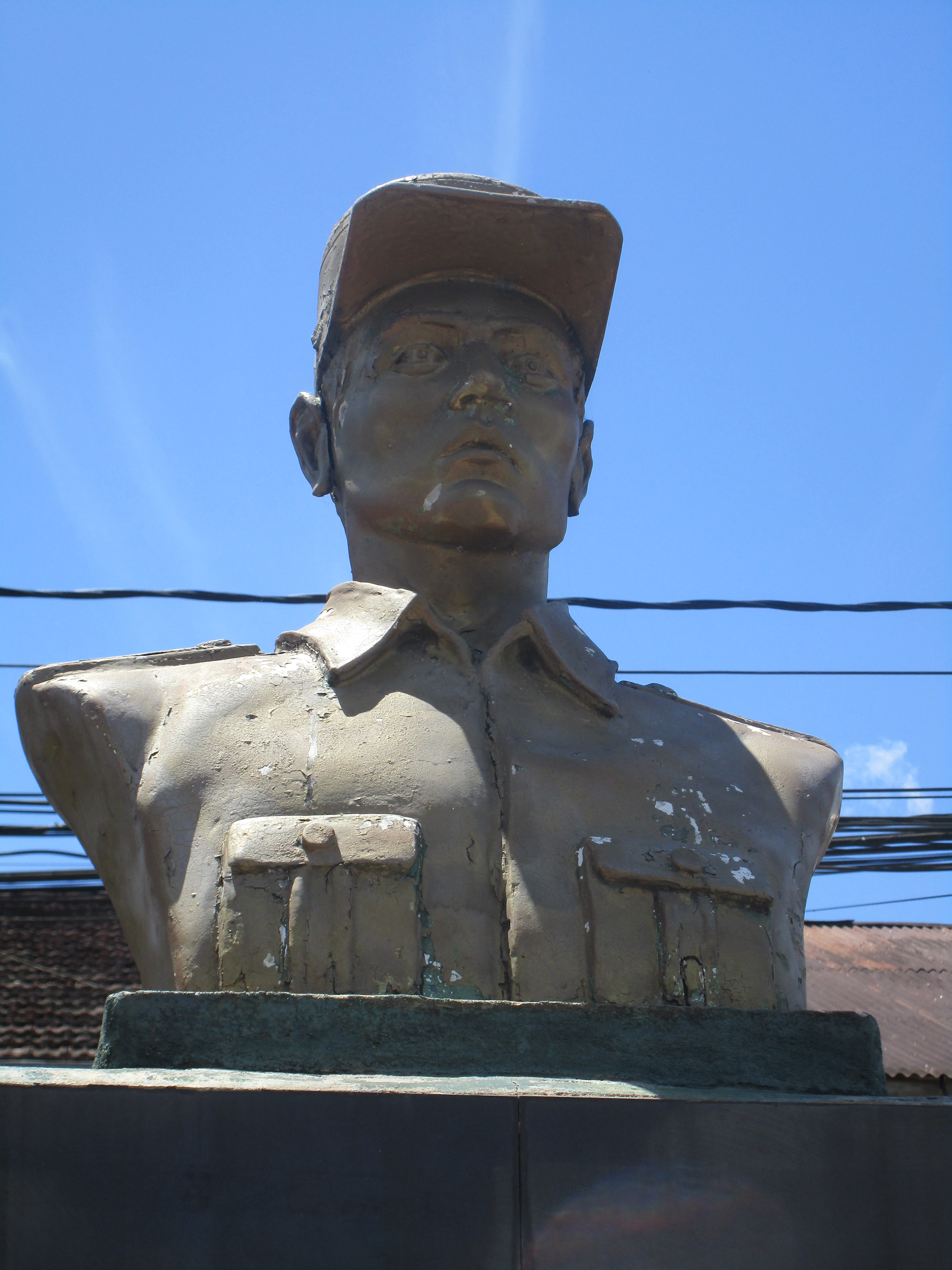
- Statue in the Walk of the Amazon Heroes
- Born: Víctor F. Pantoja y Castillo; Arequipa, Peru
- Died: July 28, 1904 Napo–Aguarico confluence (today Cabo Pantoja, Peru)
- Allegiance: Peru
- Branch: Peruvian Army
- Service years: 1884–1904
- Rank: Cabo
- Conflicts: Ecuadorian–Peruvian territorial dispute †

Víctor F. Pantoja y Castillo was a Peruvian corporal killed in action in 1904 during the Ecuadorian–Peruvian territorial dispute.

== Early life ==
Pantoja was born in Arequipa, Peru, where he entered the Peruvian Army and rose to the rank of Cabo.

== Death ==
Pantoja was deployed to a disputed area of the Amazon rainforest known as Torres Causana by Peruvians. On July 28, 1904, at 1:40 p.m., Ecuadorian troops ambushed the border outpost, raising the Ecuadorian flag, before being pushed back by the Peruvians in a two-hour battle. When Pantoja attempted to take down the Ecuadorian flag to replace it with the Peruvian flag, he was fatally shot in the chest. By the time the battle was over, 20 Ecuadorian soldiers had been killed, with three wounded and two captured. On the Peruvian side, Pantoja and another soldier named Federico R. y Tarazona were killed, with other three soldiers wounded.

== Legacy ==
His mother, Carmen Castillo, received a pension by the Peruvian government after his death.

A Peruvian outpost, later town, was named after him. It saw action during several skirmishes the 1940s, and in the context of the Ecuadorian–Peruvian War during the Battle of Pantoja and Rocafuerte.
