= Pebas =

Pebas may refer to:

- The extinct Peba language
  - The Pebas District in Peru, named after the language
- The Pebas crater on the planet Mars
- The Pebas Formation, thought to represent the deposit of a large Miocene lake (Lake Pebas)
