= Putumayo =

Putumayo may refer to:

- Putumayo Department, Colombia
- Putumayo Province, Loreto Region, Peru
- Putumayo District, Putumayo Province, Loreto Region, Peru
- Putumayo Canton, Ecuador
- Putumayo River or Içá River, a river in South America
- Putumayo World Music, an American record label
- Putumayo, a fictional store in the Seinfeld episode "The Millennium"

== See also ==
- Potemayo, Japanese manga and anime series
