= Huimeki Communal Reserve =

Protected area located in the Loreto Region of northeastern Peru

- Reserva Comunal Huimeki
- IUCN category VI (protected area with sustainable use of natural resources)
- Location within Peru
- Location: Putumayo Province, Loreto Region, Peru
- Coordinates: 0°14′54″S 75°03′22″W
- Area: 1,412.34 km^{2} (545.31 sq mi)
- Established: October 25, 2012
- Governing body: SERNANP
- Website: www.sernanp.gob.pe

The Huimeki Communal Reserve (Spanish: Reserva Comunal Huimeki) is a protected area located in the Loreto Region of northeastern Peru, specifically in the district of Teniente Manuel Clavero in the Putumayo Province. It was established on 25 October 2012 by Supreme Decree No. 006-2012-MINAM and covers an area of approximately 1,412.34 square kilometers.

The name "Huimeki" is derived from the first syllables of the Huitoto, Mestizo, and Kichwa communities who inhabit the area. The reserve is part of a larger ecological corridor in the Putumayo River basin, connected to adjacent protected areas in Peru, Colombia, and Ecuador, including the Güeppí-Sekime National Park, Airo Pai Communal Reserve, Colombia’s La Paya National Park, and Ecuador’s Cuyabeno Wildlife Reserve.

The reserve contains diverse habitats shaped by Quaternary geological formations and is recognized for its biological importance. It supports species restricted to the far northeastern Amazon of Peru that are not found in other parts of the country. Huimeki also functions as a stopover site for migratory birds traveling from southern South America to the Northern Hemisphere.

== See also ==
- Güeppí-Sekime National Park
- Airo Pai Communal Reserve
