= Yaguas District =

- District
- Location of Rosa Panduro in the Putumayo Province
- Coordinates: 2°24′41″S 71°11′1″W
- Country: Peru
- Region: Loreto
- Province: Putumayo
- Created: April 10, 2014
- Capital: Remanso
- Subdivisions: 1 populated center

Government
  - Mayor: Juan Ferreyra (2016-2018)

Area
  - Total: 18,059.27 km^{2} (6,972.72 sq mi)
- Elevation: 107 m (351 ft)

Population (2014 census)
  - Total: 1,222
  - Density: 0.06767/km^{2} (0.1753/sq mi)
- Time zone: UTC-5 (PET)
- UBIGEO: 160804
- Website: www.munirosapanduro.gob.pe

Yaguas is a district of the Putumayo Province in Peru, and one of the four districts that comprise that province.

== History ==
Yaguas was part of Maynas Province until April 10, 2014 when it was created as District by Law N° 30186 as part of Putumayo Province.

== Geography ==
The district has a total land area of 18 059,27 km². Its administrative center is located 107 meters above sea level.

== Authorities ==
The current mayor of the district is Juan Ferreyra Ahuanari (Movimiento Integración Loretana).

== See also ==
- Administrative divisions of Peru
- Yagua language
