= Airo Pai Communal Reserve =

Protected area in northern Peru

- Reserva Comunal Airo Pai
- IUCN category VI (protected area with sustainable use of natural resources)
- Location within Peru
- Location: Maynas Province and Putumayo Province, Loreto Region, Peru
- Coordinates: 0°39′01″S 74°54′45″W
- Area: 2,478.88 km^{2} (957.10 sq mi)
- Established: October 25, 2012
- Governing body: SERNANP
- Website: www.sernanp.gob.pe

The Airo Pai Communal Reserve (Spanish: Reserva Comunal Airo Pai) is a protected area in northern Peru, located in the Loreto Region, within the provinces of Maynas and Putumayo. It was established on 25 October 2012 by Supreme Decree No. 006-2012-MINAM and covers an area of 2,478.88 square kilometers.

The reserve protects a variety of Amazonian ecosystems, including upland forests, palm swamps, and seasonally flooded lowlands. It is home to species such as the Amazonian manatee, the giant South American river turtle (Podocnemis expansa), and the paiche (Arapaima gigas). The area is also culturally significant for local Indigenous communities, including the Secoya and Kichwa, who continue to use traditional pathways and sacred sites. The reserve contributes to local livelihoods by supporting subsistence activities and small-scale ecotourism.

== See also ==
- Güeppí-Sekime National Park
- Huimeki Communal Reserve
- Cuyabeno Wildlife Reserve
