= Aponte Indigenous Reserve =

- Location in Nariño Department and Indonesia Aponte Indigenous Reserve (Colombia)
- Coordinates: 1°23′14.6904″N 76°58′35.4288″W
- Country: Colombia
- Department: Nariño Department
- Municipality: El Tablon de Gomez Municipality
- Elevation: 10,715 ft (3,266 m)

Population
  - Total: ~10,000
- Time zone: UTC-5 (Colombia Standard Time)

Aponte is an indigenous reserve in El Tablon de Gómez municipality. It is located in the northern part of the department of Nariño, in southern Colombia, with approximately 5,000 inhabitants, and is a native of the Inga ethnic group from the Quechua people. Its community has its own language and being an indigenous reserve, it has special rules imposed by its community, under the command of the indigenous governor and the indigenous guard.

== History ==
The first inhabitants are said to have come to this land at the beginning of the 16th century, from the department of Putumayo, exactly Valley Sibundoy valley, ruled by the Cacique Carlos Tamabioy, a native of Santiago Putumayo. They began the journey by a bridle path through the thick jungle that separates these two towns. To this day this path is still preserved, used by ancestors to communicate between the two sister communities.

== Climate ==
The climate of Aponte Indigenous Reserve ranges from subtropical highland climate (Cfb) in the lower parts to subpolar oceanic climate (Cfc) and Tundra climate (ET) in the higher parts. The following climate data is for the central part of the reserve which has a borderline Tundra climate and subpolar oceanic climate.

Climate data for Aponte Indigenous Reserve
Month	Jan	Feb	Mar	Apr	May	Jun	Jul	Aug	Sep	Oct	Nov	Dec	Year
Mean daily maximum °C (°F)	14.0 (57.2)	13.7 (56.7)	14.0 (57.2)	14.2 (57.6)	14.0 (57.2)	13.1 (55.6)	12.1 (53.8)	12.5 (54.5)	13.3 (55.9)	14.2 (57.6)	14.2 (57.6)	13.8 (56.8)	13.6 (56.5)
Daily mean °C (°F)	9.4 (48.9)	9.4 (48.9)	9.6 (49.3)	9.9 (49.8)	9.9 (49.8)	9.2 (48.6)	8.5 (47.3)	8.7 (47.7)	9.0 (48.2)	9.6 (49.3)	9.7 (49.5)	9.3 (48.7)	9.4 (48.8)
Mean daily minimum °C (°F)	4.9 (40.8)	5.2 (41.4)	5.2 (41.4)	5.6 (42.1)	5.8 (42.4)	5.4 (41.7)	5.0 (41.0)	4.9 (40.8)	4.8 (40.6)	5.1 (41.2)	5.2 (41.4)	4.9 (40.8)	5.2 (41.3)
Average precipitation mm (inches)	142 (5.6)	147 (5.8)	193 (7.6)	255 (10.0)	272 (10.7)	277 (10.9)	316 (12.4)	225 (8.9)	173 (6.8)	206 (8.1)	185 (7.3)	167 (6.6)	2,558 (100.7)
Source: Climate-Data.org
