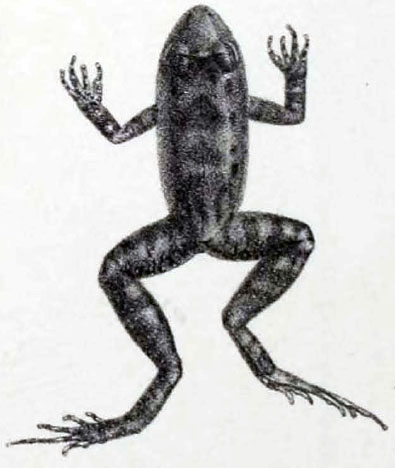

Conservation status
- Least Concern (IUCN 3.1)

Scientific classification
- Kingdom: Animalia
- Phylum: Chordata
- Class: Amphibia
- Order: Anura
- Family: Leptodactylidae
- Genus: Leptodactylus
- Species: L. discodactylus

Binomial name
- Leptodactylus discodactylus Boulenger, 1884

Synonyms
- Leptodactylus discodactylus Boulenger, 1884 "1883"; Vanzolinius discodactylus (Boulenger, 1884); Leptodactylus nigrescens Andersson, 1945

= Leptodactylus discodactylus =

Species of frog

Leptodactylus discodactylus (common name: Vanzolini's Amazon frog) is a species of frog in the family Leptodactylidae. It is found in the Amazonian Bolivia, Brazil (Amazonas and Acre states), Peru, Ecuador, and Colombia.

== Description ==
Leptodactylus discodactylus is a medium-sized, moderately robust-bodied frog. Males measure 28–35 mm (1.1–1.4 in) and females 32–35 mm (1.3–1.4 in) in snout–vent length. The colouration is reddish brown, with paler flanks. The dorsum is smooth with some small tubercles. The fingers may or may not have disks, whereas the toes end in slightly expanded and rounded disks. The species shows local-scale variation in colour pattern, morphology, and advertisement call.

== Habitat and conservation ==
Leptodactylus discodactylus is a reasonably common and generally widespread species active by day and night. It can be found on the forest floor and in swampy areas in the forest, seasonally flooded forests, and open areas.

The frog's known range overlaps many protected places: Parque Nacional Yasuní, Reserva Biólogica Limoncocha, Reserva de Producción Faunística Cuyabeno in Ecuador, Gueppi Reserved Zone in Peru, Reserva Extrativista do Alto Jurua, and Reserva Extrativista do Baixo Jurua.

Leptodactylus discodactylus is locally suffering from habitat loss associate with agriculture, logging, and other human purposes.
