= Aguarico Canton =

- Canton
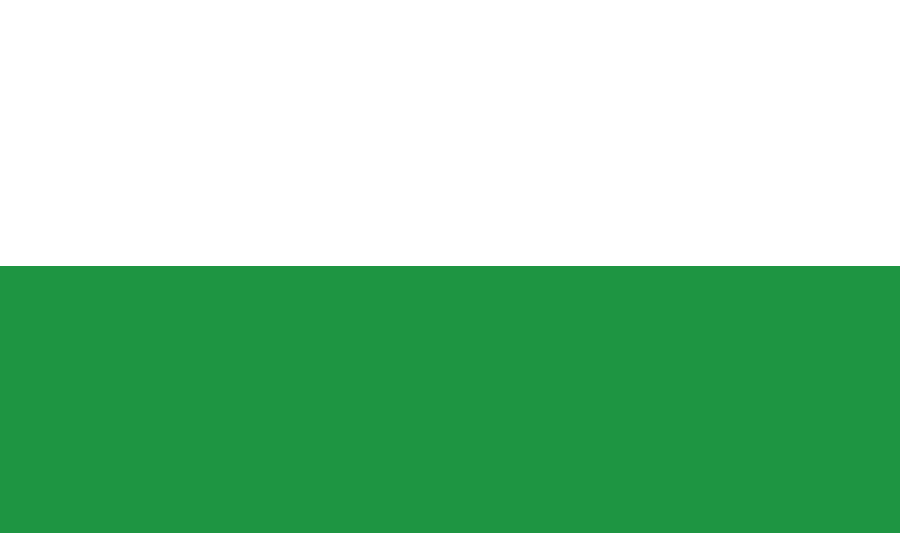
- Flag

- Location of Orellana Province in Ecuador.

- Aguarico Canton in Orellana Province
- Coordinates: 0°55′16″S 75°23′57″W
- Country: Ecuador
- Province: Orellana Province
- Capital: Nuevo Rocafuerte

Area
  - Total: 11,212 km^{2} (4,329 sq mi)

Population (2022 census)
  - Total: 6,872
  - Density: 0.6129/km^{2} (1.587/sq mi)
- Time zone: UTC-5 (ECT)

Aguarico Canton is a canton of Ecuador, located in the Orellana Province. Its capital is the town of Nuevo Rocafuerte. Its population at the 2010 census was 4,658 INEC 2010.

Aguarico is part of the Cuyabeno Natural Reserve and Yasuni National Park.

== History ==
Aguarico dates from the late nineteenth century during an estate boom on the banks of the Napo River in the Amazon region. During the invasion of Peru in Ecuador in 1941, Rocafuerte was taken by the Peruvian army after defeating the Ecuadorian military garrison on 11 August of that year. Following the armed conflict, almost all rubber plantations were abandoned.

On 22 February 1945, by order of President Jose Maria Velasco Ibarra, the town of Nuevo Rocafuerte officially became the new county seat of the Canton of Aguarico.

== Parishes ==
- Nuevo Rocafuerte
- Cononaco
- Tiputini
- Yasuní
- Santa María Huiririma
- Capitán Augusto Rivadeneira.

== Demographics ==
Ethnic groups as of the Ecuadorian census of 2010:

- Indigenous 77.4%
- Mestizo 20.1%
- Afro-Ecuadorian 1.4%
- White 0.8%
- Montubio 0.1%
- Other 0.1%

== Places of interest ==
- Cuyabeno Wildlife Reserve
