= Puerto Arica =

- Municipality and town
- Location of the county of Puerto Arica

- Location of the town of Puerto Arica
- Coordinates: 2°8′53″S 71°45′12″W
- Country: Colombia
- Department: Amazonas Department
- Elevation: 96 m (315 ft)

Population (2015)
  - Total: 1,350
- Time zone: UTC-5 (Colombia Standard Time)
- Climate: Af

Puerto Arica is a town and municipality in the Colombian Department of Amazonas. As of 2015, the population of Puerto Arica was 1,350.

== History ==
Originally founded by Peruvian refugees from the War of the Pacific, it was awarded to Colombia after the signing of the July 1922 Salomón-Lozano Treaty. These refugees would later resettle in the settlement of the same name in northern Peru.

== Climate ==
Puerto Arica has a tropical rainforest climate (Köppen Af) with heavy to very heavy rainfall year-round.

Climate data for Puerto Arica
Month	Jan	Feb	Mar	Apr	May	Jun	Jul	Aug	Sep	Oct	Nov	Dec	Year
Mean daily maximum °C (°F)	31.1 (88.0)	31.4 (88.5)	31.0 (87.8)	31.4 (88.5)	30.4 (86.7)	29.6 (85.3)	30.0 (86.0)	30.6 (87.1)	30.9 (87.6)	30.8 (87.4)	31.1 (88.0)	31.6 (88.9)	30.8 (87.5)
Daily mean °C (°F)	26.5 (79.7)	26.5 (79.7)	26.4 (79.5)	26.6 (79.9)	26.2 (79.2)	25.5 (77.9)	25.5 (77.9)	25.7 (78.3)	26.2 (79.2)	26.5 (79.7)	27.1 (80.8)	26.8 (80.2)	26.3 (79.3)
Mean daily minimum °C (°F)	21.9 (71.4)	21.7 (71.1)	21.9 (71.4)	21.8 (71.2)	22.1 (71.8)	21.4 (70.5)	21.0 (69.8)	20.9 (69.6)	21.5 (70.7)	22.3 (72.1)	23.1 (73.6)	22.0 (71.6)	21.8 (71.2)
Average rainfall mm (inches)	269.9 (10.63)	276.3 (10.88)	355.9 (14.01)	430.7 (16.96)	254.8 (10.03)	205.5 (8.09)	221.8 (8.73)	144.6 (5.69)	159.3 (6.27)	204.2 (8.04)	224.6 (8.84)	248.7 (9.79)	2,996.3 (117.96)
Average rainy days (≥ 1 mm)	13	12	16	16	16	16	14	12	10	13	13	15	166
Source 1: IDEAM
Source 2: Climate-Data.org

== Transportation ==
The municipality is served by Arica Airport.
