= San Antonio del Estrecho =

- Town
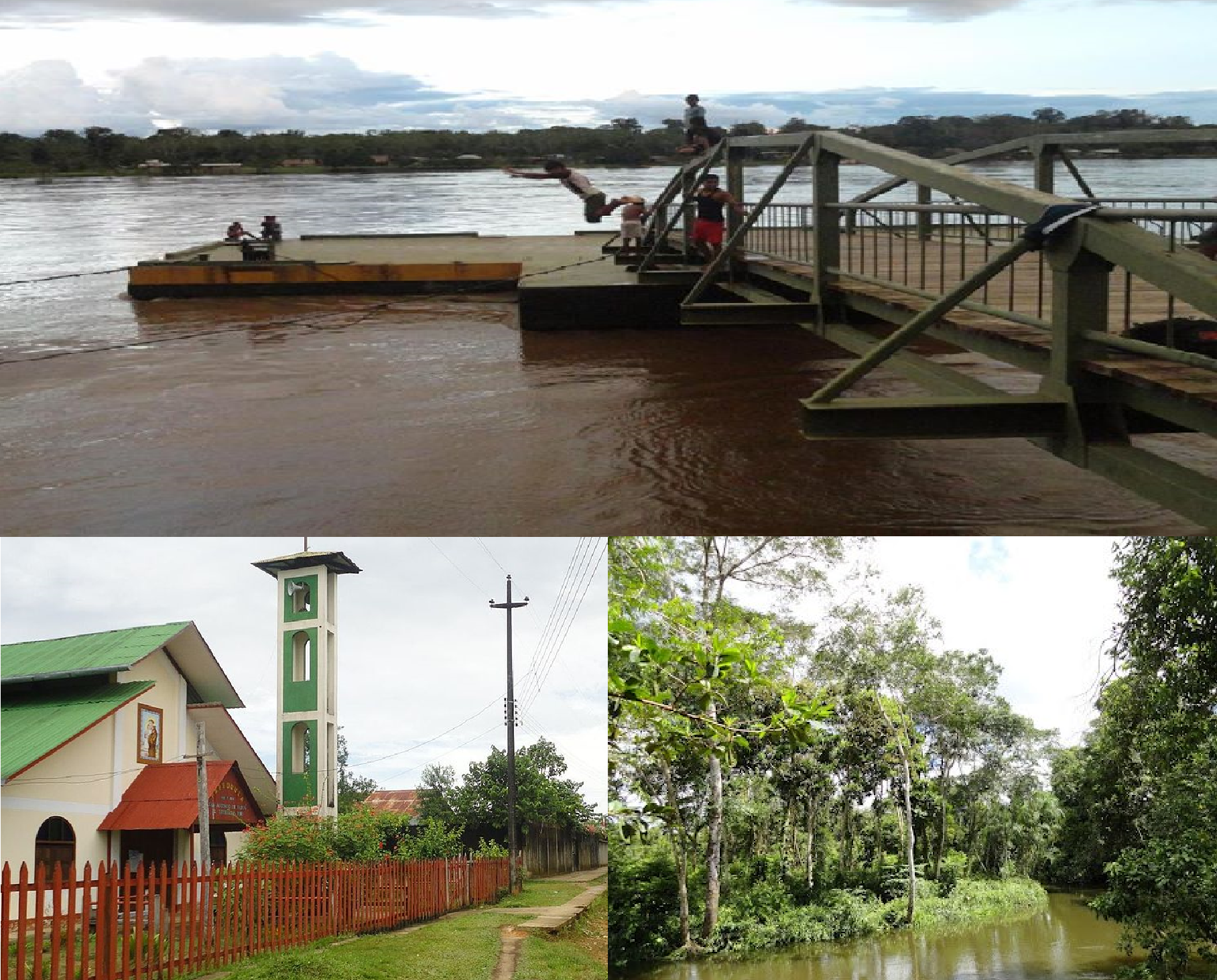

- Location within Peru
- Coordinates: 2°26′54″S 72°40′06″W
- Country: Peru
- Region: Loreto
- Province: Putumayo
- District: Putumayo
- Established: 2 July 1943

Government
  - Mayor: Humberto Fuentes Tello

Population (2014)
  - Total: 8,000
- Time zone: UTC-5 (PET)

San Antonio del Estrecho is a town in northern Peru, capital of Putumayo Province in Loreto Region. According to the 2014 census, it had a population of 8,000 people. It is served by the El Estrecho Airport.
