= Lake Pilchicocha =

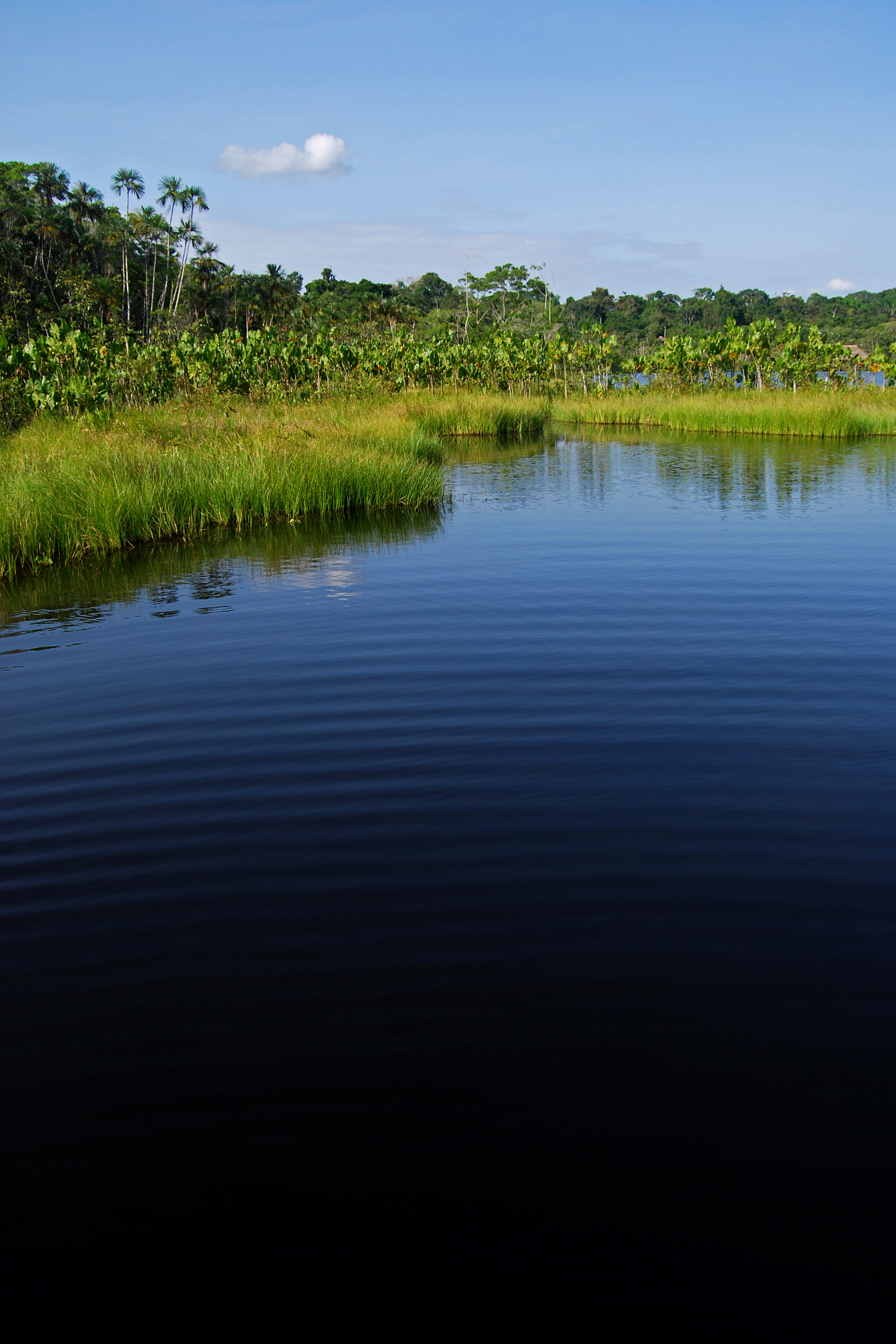

- Location within Ecuador Location within South America
- Location: Sucumbíos Province
- Coordinates: 00°28′25″S 76°27′36″W
- Type: Lake
- Basin countries: Ecuador

Lake Pilchicocha is a „blackwatered“ lake, in the Province of Sucumbíos of Ecuador.

== Geography ==
Lake Pilchicocha is located in the eastern Ecuadorian Amazon Basin, and about 2.1 miles (1,3 km) from the Napo River. The fish population consists mainly of Scavenger-Piranhas.

Northeast of the Lake one can find a Wildlife Lodge („Sacha Lodge“), commonly used by birdwatchers and hikers.

== See also ==
- Lake Garzacocha
