= Rosa Panduro =

Peruvian war hero

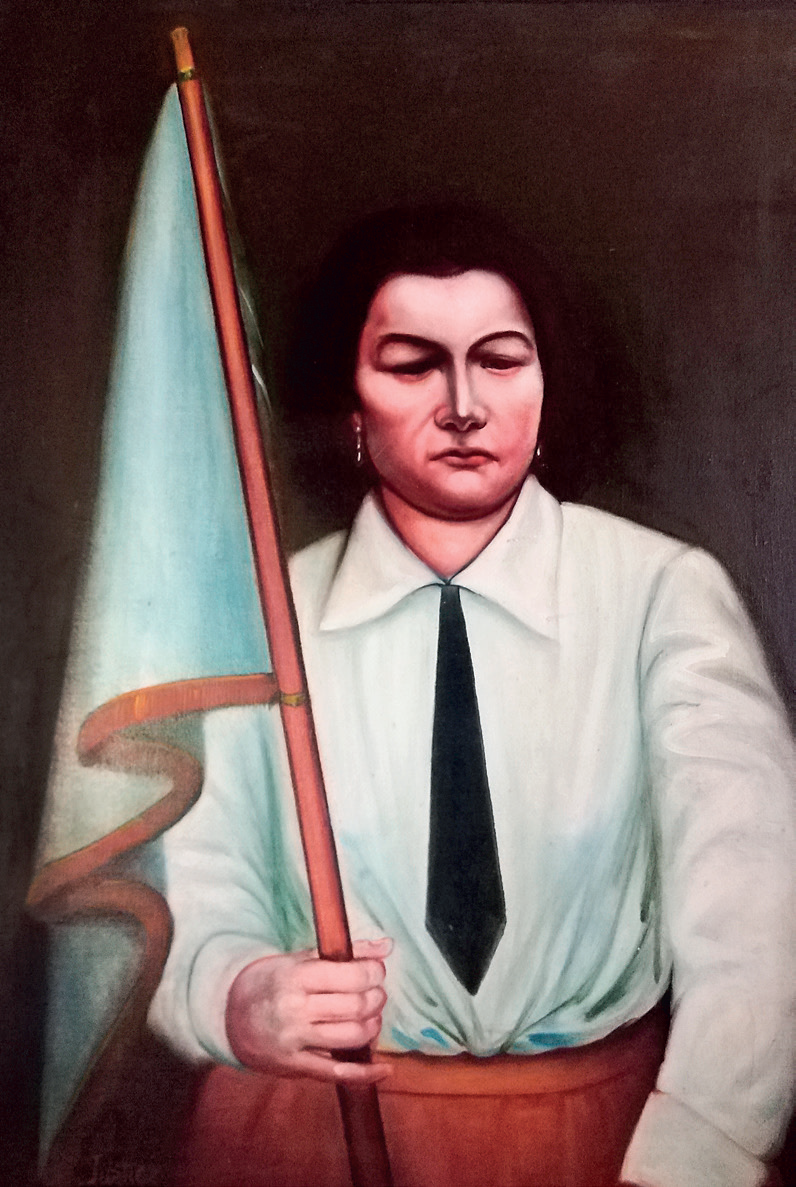
- Born: Carmen Rosa Panduro Ramírez; December 10, 1918; Requena, Peru
- Died: November 11, 1989 (aged 70); Iquitos, Peru
- Resting place: Cementerio General San Miguel Arcángel
- Other name: Heroine of Rocafuerte
- Known for: Volunteering during the Battle of Rocafuerte
- Spouse: Juan Manuel Peñaherrera Valera
- Military career
- Allegiance: Peru
- Branch: Peruvian Army
- Service years: 1941
- Conflicts: Ecuadorian–Peruvian War: Battle of Rocafuerte

Carmen Rosa Panduro Ramírez was a Peruvian housewife who fought against Ecuadorian troops in the Battle of Rocafuerte during the 1941 Ecuadorian–Peruvian War.

== Early life ==
Panduro was born in 1918 in Requena to parents María Ramírez Coral and Federico Panduro Sandoval. She later married Peruvian second sergeant Juan Manuel Peñaherrera Valera, with whom she had two children.

== Battle of Rocafuerte ==
On August 11, 1941, during the context of the Ecuadorian–Peruvian War, hostilities broke out between Ecuadorian and Peruvian troops, which then escalated into a battle. This was despite the fact that a ceasefire had been declared eleven days prior and both parties were located in their respective side of the de facto border agreed upon by both parties in 1936.

During the battle, Panduro's husband was assigned to the frontline, and a military exclusion zone had been established. Despite this, she caught up with him. After he was shot in the arm, she treated him by bandaging his arm with his own uniform, as well as other wounded soldiers. After treating her husband, she grabbed a rifle and took part in the battle, later attempting to board the Peruvian gunboat Amazonas, only to be ordered to get off by military personnel.

== Later life ==
She died in Iquitos on November 11, 1989. She is remembered and referred to as a heroine in Peruvian history, most specifically in the history of Loreto.

Rosa Panduro District was created in 2014, named in her honor.
