= Cabo Pantoja =

Town in Loreto Department, Peru

- Populated centre
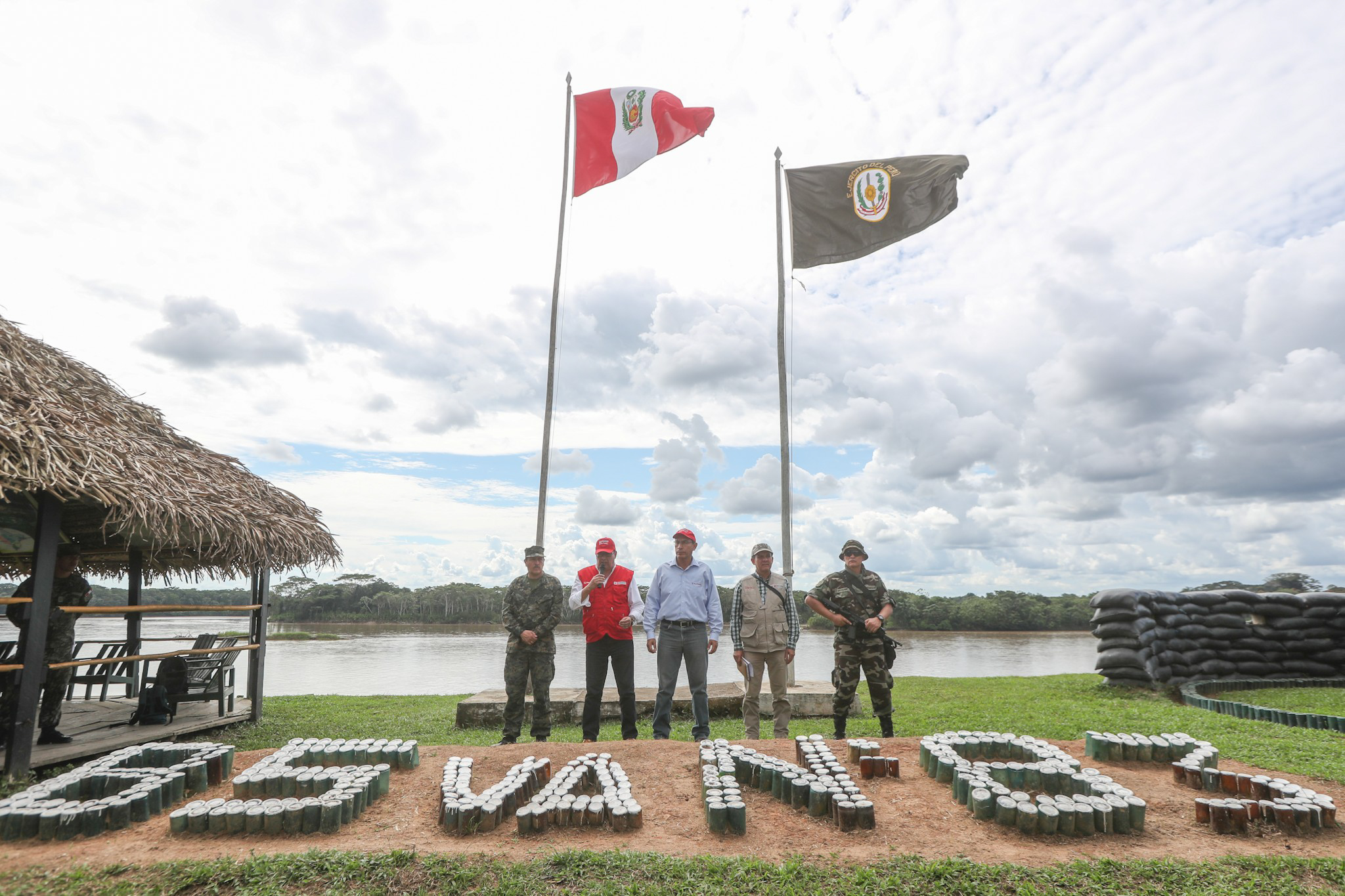
- Martín Vizcarra visiting the town

- Location within Peru
- Coordinates: 0°57′25″S 75°27′11″W
- Country: Peru
- Department: Loreto
- Province: Maynas
- District: Torres Causana
- Founded: June 2, 1920

Population (2007)
  - Total: 564
- Time zone: UTC-5 (PET)

Cabo Pantoja, formerly Rocafuerte and Pantoja, is a town in the Torres Causana District of the Loreto Department in Peru.

== History ==
The town, located in the confluence between the Napo and Aguarico rivers, was the location of an Ecuadorian outpost named Rocafuerte and a small Peruvian outpost who bore the current name used by the town, both established during the era of the territorial dispute between Ecuador and Peru. Subsequently, it saw action during several skirmishes, but most notably during the 1941 Ecuadorian–Peruvian War in the Battle of Pantoja and Rocafuerte. After the Peruvian victory, it was renamed Cabo Pantoja, after Peruvian Cabo Víctor Pantoja, killed in action during a minor battle between Ecuador and Peru over the dispute in 1904. The Ecuadorian inhabitants relocated as a result of the battle and established Nuevo Rocafuerte.

Today the town hosts a small health centre and schools, as well as infrastructure related to water, telecommunication and health services.
