= Yasuní River =

River of Ecuador

Location
- Country: Ecuador

Physical characteristics
- Mouth
  - location: Napo River

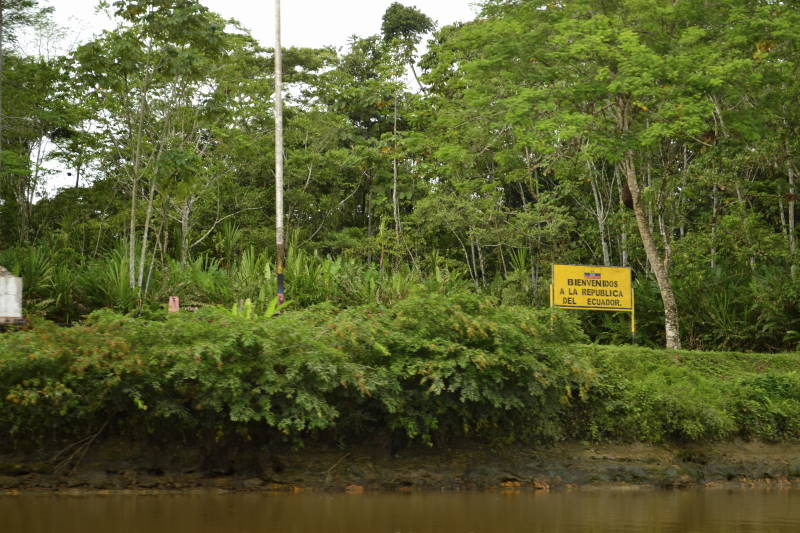
Q Rio Yasuni

The Yasuní River is a river of eastern Ecuador. It is a tributary of the Napo River.

== See also ==
- List of rivers of Ecuador
