= Battle of Pantoja and Rocafuerte =

Battle of the 1941 Ecuadorian–Peruvian War

Coordinates: 0.9706824°S 75.1745138°W

- Part of the Ecuadorian–Peruvian War
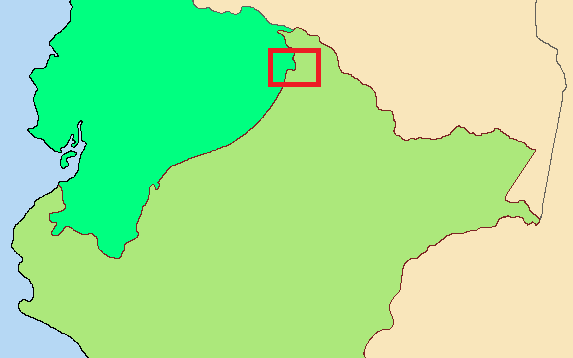
- Location of the battle with modern day borders
Date	11 August 1941
Location	Napo–Aguarico confluence (today Cabo Pantoja, Peru)
Result	Peruvian victory
Territorial changes	Ecuadorian troops relocate away from the confluence

Belligerents
Peru	Ecuador

Commanders and leaders
Gen. Antonio Silva Santisteban; Maj. Manuel Moria Concha; Corvette Cpt. Florencio Texeira Vela	Carlos Escalante †; José Arias Cox (POW)

Units involved
5th Light Division: Pantoja Garrison; 27th Infantry Battalion; 5th Artillery Group (partial); 1 Air Force Squadron	14th Battalion Oriente

Strength
2 rifle companies 1 machine gun company 3 machine gun platoons 2 75mm batteries BAP Amazonas; 1 civilian volunteer	1 rifle company 1 machine gun company 2 47mm cannons

Casualties and losses
25 dead 40 wounded	50 dead 90 wounded 29 captured 6 civilians drowned

The Battle of Pantoja and Rocafuerte, known also simply as the Battle of Rocafuerte, was a military confrontation between Peru and Ecuador that took place on August 11, 1941, during the Ecuadorian–Peruvian War.

== Background ==
Hostilities between Peru and Ecuador began on July 5, 1941, when fire was exchanged between both parties. By late July, a full-on offensive was being carried out by Peru in the coastal region of southern Ecuador, and fire was being once again (hostilities had occurred in the past) exchanged in the disputed Amazon as well. A ceasefire had been declared by Ecuador, effective on July 31, but skirmishes between both parties continued nevertheless.

== Battle ==
Both parties started exchanging fire at 4 a.m. according to Peru. Who started the attack, however, is disputed by both parties as well. The Ecuadorian outpost, Rocafuerte, was well supplied and in a good position, and the Peruvian outpost, Cabo Pantoja, was on a small island with trees blocking the view located in the Napo–Aguarico confluence. At the time, both outposts were located in what was known as the Status quo line, agreed upon by both countries in 1936 to serve as a provisional border, and were separated by an eponymous bridge. During the battle, Major Arias attempted to negotiate a ceasefire but was unsuccessful in doing so as the Peruvians demanded an unconditional surrender, something he was not authorized to approve. According to Peru, Arias also unsuccessfully attempted to communicate with Major Escalante, who had fled the scene. According to Ecuador, Peru used air support in addition to its frigate to heavily bombard the outpost.

The battle went on for hours, and the Ecuadorian forces were eventually forced to retreat, with Peru eventually overrunning the outpost and capturing several men, including Arias, and by 12 p.m. the Flag of Peru had been risen on the Ecuadorian outpost, ending the battle. Ecuadorian accounts claim that the men had to leave almost naked and extremely unprepared, and that due to the harsh nature of the local environment, six children drowned.

== Aftermath ==
The government of Ecuador, led by Dr. Carlos Alberto Arroyo del Río, signed the Rio de Janeiro Protocol on January 29, 1942, with which Ecuador officially renounced its claim to a sovereign outlet to the Amazon River.

Rosa Panduro District was created in 2014, named after Rosa Panduro, a housewife who participated in the battle along with her husband.
