= Peba–Yaguan languages =

Northwestern Amazonian language family

Peba–Yaguan
- Yawan, Peban
- Geographic distribution: western Amazon
- Linguistic classification: One of the world's primary language families (Saparo–Yawan ?)
- Subdivisions: Yagua; Yameo †; Peba †

Language codes
- Glottolog: peba1241

The Peba–Yaguan language family (also Yaguan, Peban, Yáwan) is located in the northwestern Amazon, but today Yagua is the only remaining spoken language of the family.

== Internal structure ==
French ethnologist Paul Rivet had suggested that the Peba–Yaguan family had been divided into two branches, with Yameo in one branch, and Peba and Yagua in the other. There is extremely little documentation of Yameo and Peba, both of which are now extinct, though the town Pebas on the Amazon River clearly takes its name from this group of people. The available documentation is largely due to the efforts of early Catholic missionaries, as summarized by Rivet.

- Peba–Yaguan
  - - Yameo
    - Masamae (Mazán, Parara)
  - - Peba
    - Yagua

Brazilian linguist Marcelo Jolkesky (2016) groups Peba and Yameo in one branch, and Yagua in another separate branch.

== Classification ==
There is no sound scientific evidence yet that the Peba–Yaguan family is related to any other family or stock of South America (in particular, there is no evidence for grouping it with Cariban languages). There has likely been contact between the Yaguas and Bora–Witotoan peoples, perhaps particularly during the era of the rubber-trade; this may account for some structural similarities between the languages. Kaufman (2007) includes Sabela, Taushiro, and Omurano in his Yawan family.

== Language contact ==
Jolkesky (2016) notes that there are lexical similarities with the Kwaza, Zaparoan, and Nambikwaran language families due to contact.
