= Arica Airport (Colombia) =

- IATA: ACM; ICAO: none

Summary
- Location: Puerto Arica, Colombia
- Coordinates: 2°8′43.5732″S 71°45′29.016″W

Map

Arica Airport (IATA: ACM) is an airport in Puerto Arica, Colombia.
