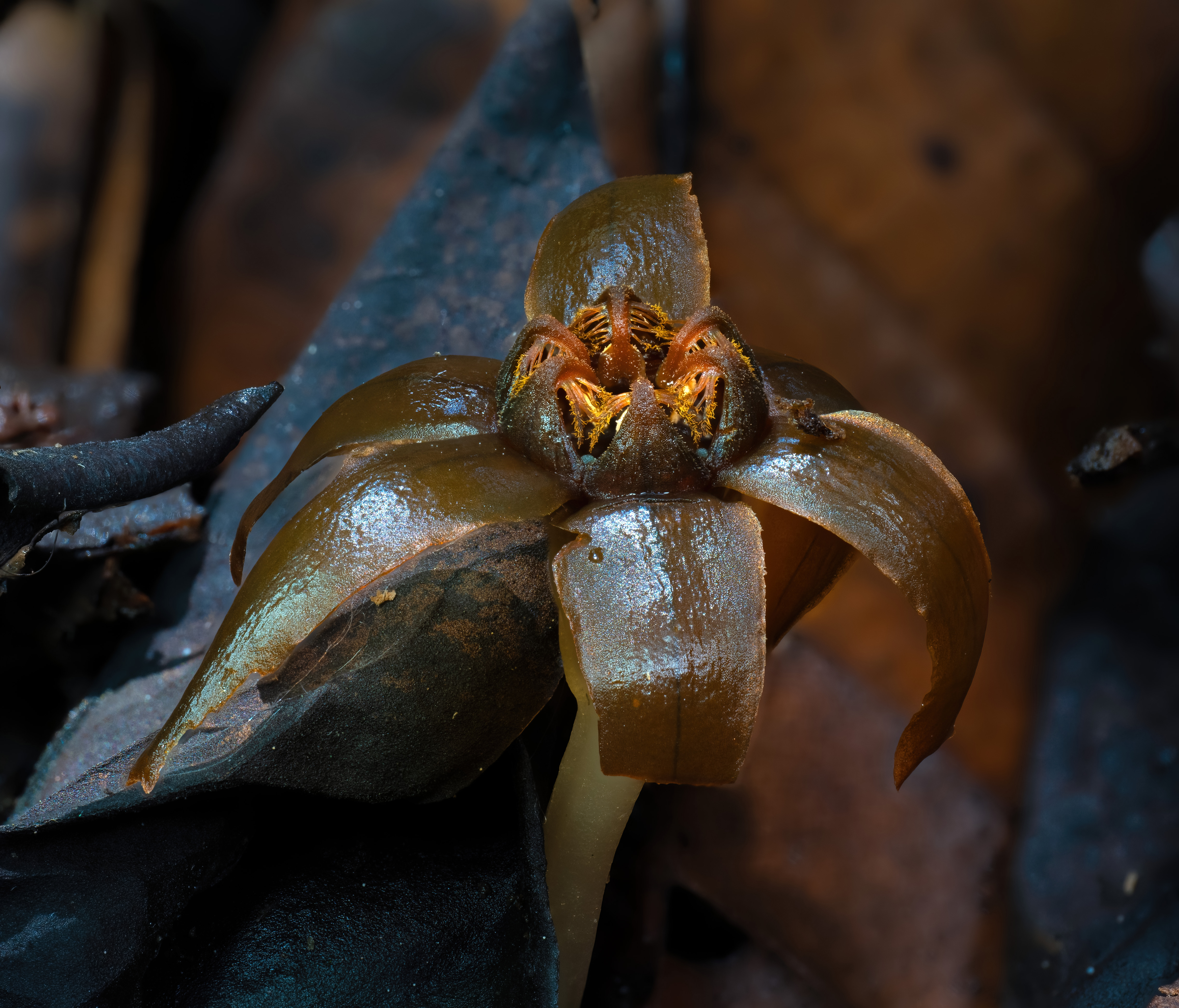
- Tiputinia foetida on forest floor in Pastaza, Ecuador (April 2024)

Scientific classification
- Kingdom: Plantae
- Clade: Tracheophytes
- Clade: Angiosperms
- Clade: Monocots
- Order: Dioscoreales
- Family: Burmanniaceae
- Genus: Tiputinia; P.E.Berry & C.L.Woodw.
- Species: T. foetida

Binomial name
- Tiputinia foetida P.E.Berry & C.L.Woodw., 2007

= Tiputinia =

Genus of plants

Tiputinia is a genus of myco-heterotrophic plants in the family Burmanniaceae, first described as a genus in 2007. There is only one known species, Tiputinia foetida, formerly thought to be endemic to eastern Ecuador, new records from Peru suggest that the distribution is more widespread than formerly thought. The plant is mycotrophic, i.e. lacking chlorophyll and obtaining sustenance from fungi in the soil.

== Gallery ==
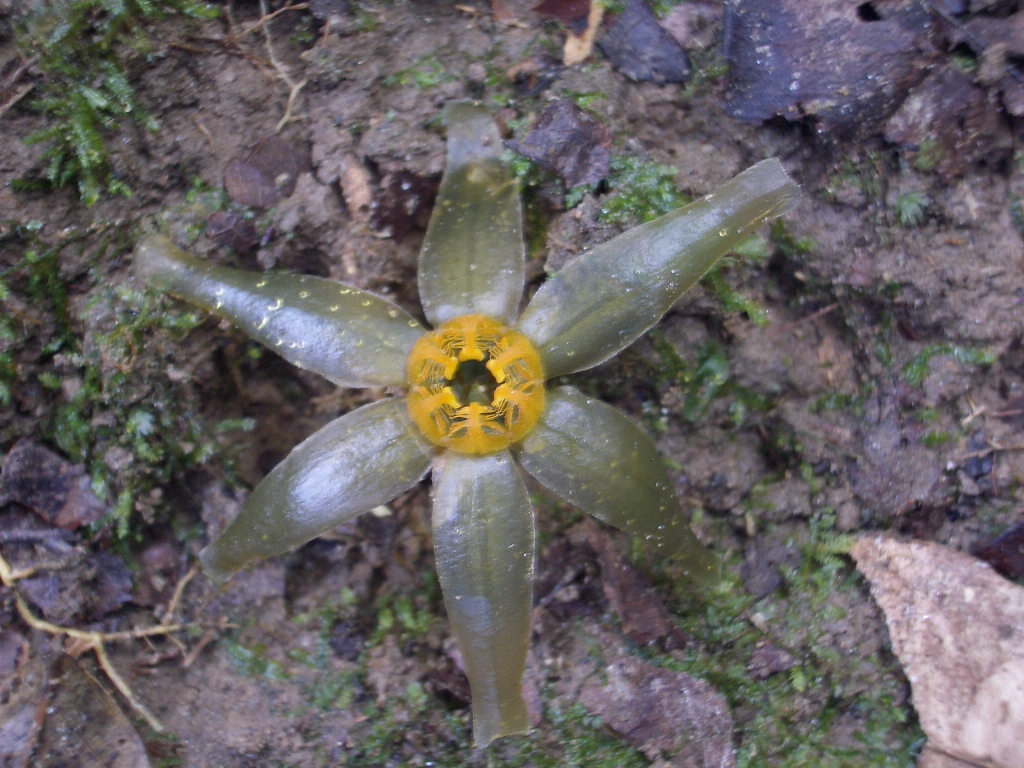
Tiputinia foetida on forest floor at Tiputini Biodiversity Station, Napo, Ecuador (April 2005)

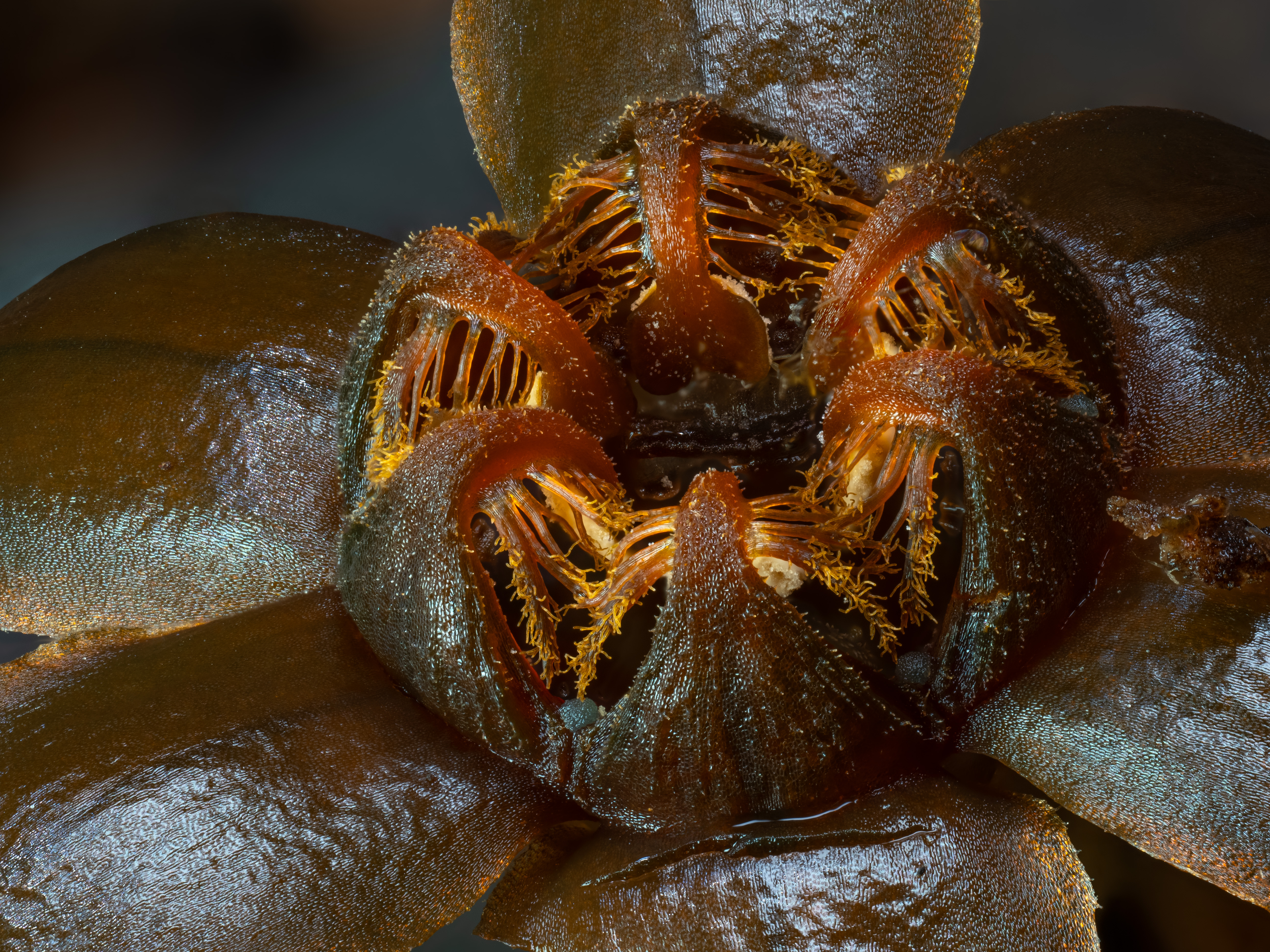
Tiputinia foetida closeup
