= El Tablón =

Coordinates: 1°25′37″N 77°5′49″W

El Tablón de Gómez
- Municipality and town
- Flag

- Location of the municipality and town of El Tablón in the Nariño Department of Colombia.
- Country: Colombia
- Department: Nariño Department

Area
  - Total: 315 km^{2} (122 sq mi)

Population (Census 2018)
  - Total: 13,255
  - Density: 42.1/km^{2} (109/sq mi)
- Time zone: UTC-5 (Colombia Standard Time)

El Tablón is a town and municipality in the Nariño Department, Colombia. It contains "mystical stone statues" from the pre-Columbian era and other archaeological sites. The Aponte Indigenous Reserve is located within the municipality.
