= Tiputini River =

River of Ecuador

Coordinates: 0.819°S 75.544°W

- The river downstream from the Repsol/YPF road

Location
- Country: Ecuador

Physical characteristics
- Mouth
  - location: Napo River

The Tiputini River is a tributary of the Napo River in Ecuador. It is the first major, navagable river south of the Napo and forms the northern border of Yasuni National Park. Unlike the Napo, the Tiputini has a relatively deep, narrow channel carved deep into the clay of the Amazon Basin, and it often fluctuates in depth by several meters from day to day.

Though there are no major settlements along the Tiputini, there are several small Huaorani communities along its western half, and the Tiputini Biodiversity Station is situated on its north bank. An oil road also crosses the Tiputini River several times on the western edge of Yasuni National Park.
