= Teniente Manuel Clavero District =

Teniente Manuel Clavero
- District
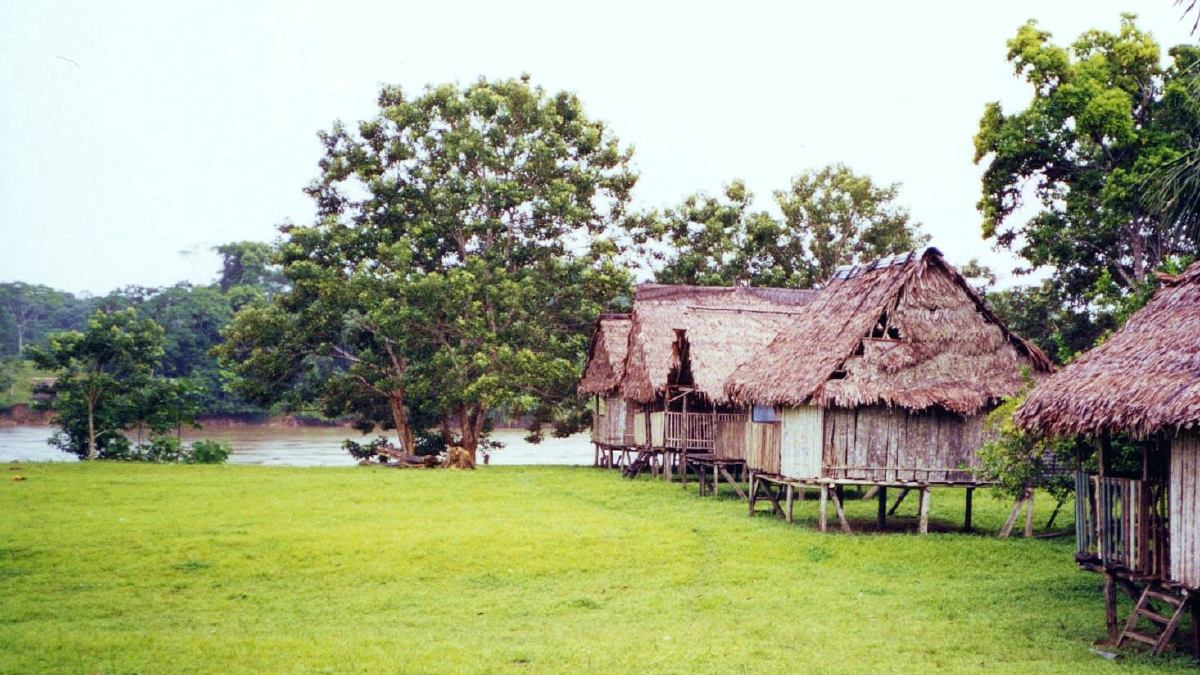
- Interactive map of Teniente Manuel Clavero
- Coordinates: 0°22′42″S 74°40′31″W
- Country: Peru
- Region: Loreto
- Province: Putumayo
- Founded: October 19, 2004
- Capital: Soplin Vargas

Government
  - Mayor: Luis Enrique Calderón Aspajo (2015-2018)

Area
  - Total: 9,621.17 km^{2} (3,714.75 sq mi)
- Elevation: 180 m (590 ft)

Population (2017)
  - Total: 2,317
  - Density: 0.2408/km^{2} (0.6237/sq mi)
- Time zone: UTC-5 (PET)
- UBIGEO: 160803

Teniente Manuel Clavero District (Spanish teniente lieutenant) is one of four districts of the Putumayo Province in Peru. It is also the northernmost district in Peru.

== Authorities ==
The current mayor of the district is Luis Enrique Calderón Aspajo (Fuerza Loretana).

== See also ==
- Administrative divisions of Peru
