= Pebas District =

Coordinates: 3.3283°S 71.8610°W

- District
- Interactive map of Pebas District
- Country: Peru
- Region: Loreto
- Province: Mariscal Ramón Castilla
- Founded: February 7, 1866
- Capital: Pebas

Area
  - Total: 11,437 km^{2} (4,416 sq mi)
- Elevation: 101 m (331 ft)

Population (2005 census)
  - Total: 12,663
  - Density: 1.1072/km^{2} (2.8676/sq mi)
- Time zone: UTC-5 (PET)
- UBIGEO: 160402

Pebas District is one of four districts of the province Mariscal Ramón Castilla in Peru. Its name is derived from Peba, an indigenous ethnic group and language.

== Climate ==
Climate data for Pebas, elevation 102 m (335 ft), (1991–2020)
Month	Jan	Feb	Mar	Apr	May	Jun	Jul	Aug	Sep	Oct	Nov	Dec	Year
Mean daily maximum °C (°F)	31.5 (88.7)	31.5 (88.7)	31.4 (88.5)	31.2 (88.2)	30.7 (87.3)	30.5 (86.9)	30.8 (87.4)	31.9 (89.4)	32.6 (90.7)	32.6 (90.7)	32.2 (90.0)	31.6 (88.9)	31.5 (88.8)
Mean daily minimum °C (°F)	23.0 (73.4)	23.0 (73.4)	22.9 (73.2)	22.8 (73.0)	22.6 (72.7)	22.1 (71.8)	21.6 (70.9)	21.7 (71.1)	22.3 (72.1)	22.7 (72.9)	22.9 (73.2)	23.1 (73.6)	22.6 (72.6)
Average precipitation mm (inches)	323.0 (12.72)	303.3 (11.94)	359.0 (14.13)	338.1 (13.31)	309.2 (12.17)	225.5 (8.88)	161.1 (6.34)	147.8 (5.82)	199.5 (7.85)	243.8 (9.60)	266.6 (10.50)	327.4 (12.89)	3,204.3 (126.15)
Source: National Meteorology and Hydrology Service of Peru
