= Nuevo Rocafuerte =

Town in Orellana, Ecuador

Coordinates: 0.933333°S 75.4°W

- Town
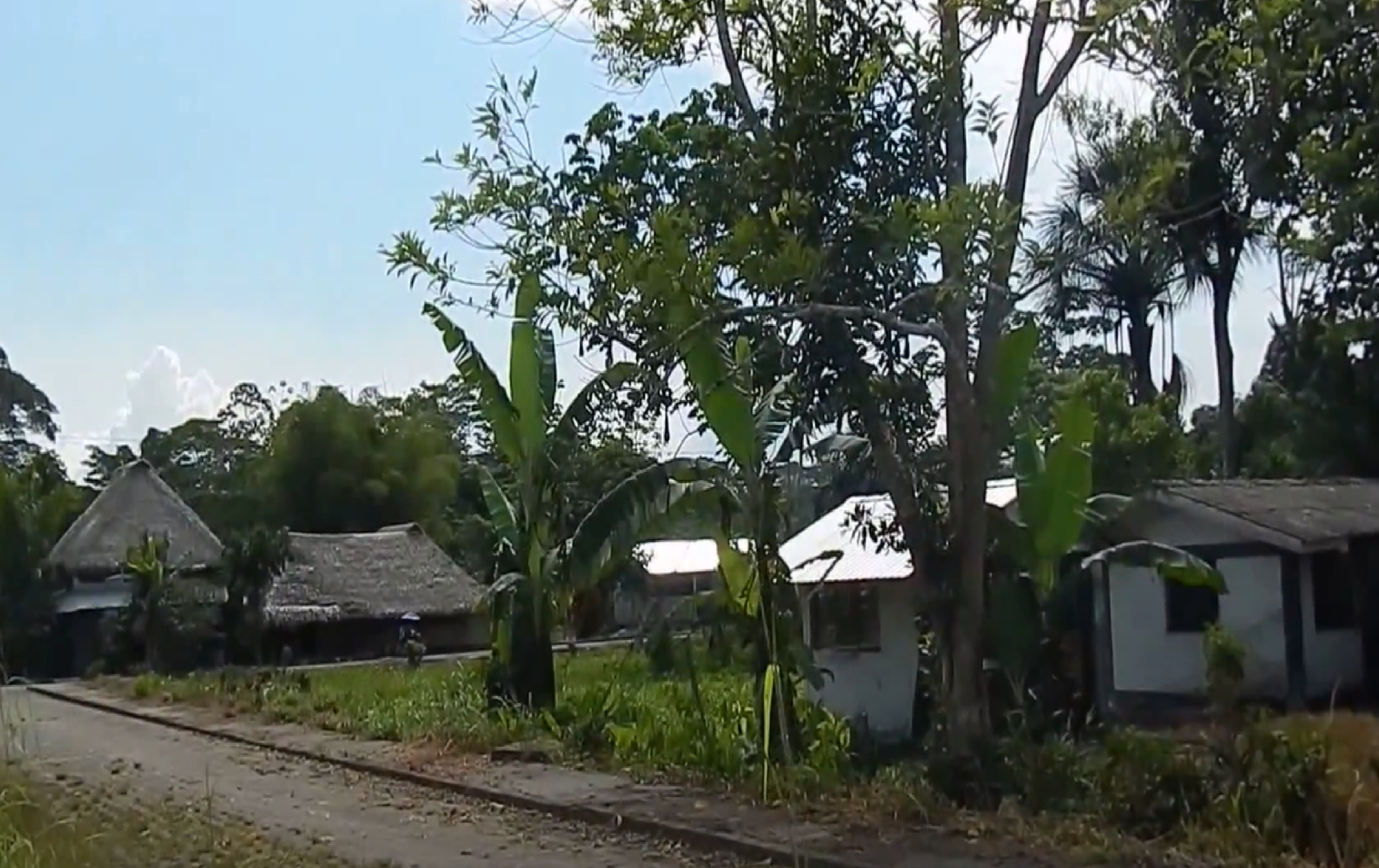
- Nuevo Rocafuerte
- Interactive map of Nuevo Rocafuerte
- Country: Ecuador
- Province: Orellana
- Canton: Aguarico Canton

Area
  - Town: 1.67 km^{2} (0.64 sq mi)

Population (2022 census)
  - Town: 657
  - Density: 393/km^{2} (1,020/sq mi)

Nuevo Rocafuerte is a town in Ecuador. The capital of Aguarico Canton in Orellana Province, it was founded in 1942 as a result of a battle which displaced the inhabitants of the original settlement and subsequent border agreements which made this location a key border spot on the border with Peru.

It is the birthplace of 46th Ecuadorian president Lenín Moreno.

== Climate ==
Nuevo Rocafuerte has a tropical rainforest climate (Af) with heavy rainfall year-round.

Climate data for Nuevo Rocafuerte
Month	Jan	Feb	Mar	Apr	May	Jun	Jul	Aug	Sep	Oct	Nov	Dec	Year
Mean daily maximum °C (°F)	31.3 (88.3)	30.9 (87.6)	30.6 (87.1)	30.0 (86.0)	29.7 (85.5)	28.9 (84.0)	28.5 (83.3)	30.0 (86.0)	30.8 (87.4)	30.8 (87.4)	31.0 (87.8)	31.0 (87.8)	30.3 (86.5)
Daily mean °C (°F)	26.3 (79.3)	25.9 (78.6)	25.9 (78.6)	25.6 (78.1)	25.4 (77.7)	24.6 (76.3)	24.2 (75.6)	25.0 (77.0)	25.5 (77.9)	25.9 (78.6)	26.2 (79.2)	26.1 (79.0)	25.6 (78.0)
Mean daily minimum °C (°F)	21.4 (70.5)	21.0 (69.8)	21.3 (70.3)	21.2 (70.2)	21.2 (70.2)	20.4 (68.7)	19.9 (67.8)	20.0 (68.0)	20.2 (68.4)	21.0 (69.8)	21.5 (70.7)	21.3 (70.3)	20.9 (69.6)
Average rainfall mm (inches)	152 (6.0)	167 (6.6)	217 (8.5)	267 (10.5)	329 (13.0)	308 (12.1)	280 (11.0)	222 (8.7)	229 (9.0)	223 (8.8)	193 (7.6)	152 (6.0)	2,739 (107.8)
Source: Climate-Data.org

== Sources ==
- Columbia Lippincott Gazetteer (New York: Columbia University Press, 1952) p. 1354.
