= Putumayo District =

Putumayo
- District
- Location of Putumayo in the Putumayo Province
- Coordinates: 2°26′59″S 72°39′20″W
- Country: Peru
- Region: Loreto
- Province: Putumayo
- Founded: July 2, 1943
- Capital: San Antonio del Estrecho

Government
  - Mayor: Humberto Fuentes Tello

Area
  - Total: 11,080.80 km^{2} (4,278.32 sq mi)
- Elevation: 106 m (348 ft)

Population (2017)
  - Total: 3,666
  - Density: 0.3308/km^{2} (0.8569/sq mi)
- Time zone: UTC-5 (PET)
- UBIGEO: 160801

Putumayo District is one of four districts of the Putumayo Province in Peru.

== History ==
Putumayo District belonged to Maynas Province until Putumayo Province was created on May 5, 2014, in President Ollanta Humala's term.

== Geography ==
It has an area of 34,942.9 km^{2}.

== Authorities ==
=== Mayors ===
- 2016–2018: Segundo Julca Ramos (Movimiento Integración Loretana).

== See also ==
- Administrative divisions of Peru
