= Torres Causana District =

Coordinates: 0.9704°S 75.1730°W

Torres Causana
- District
- Interactive map of Torres Causana
- Country: Peru
- Region: Loreto
- Province: Maynas
- Founded: July 2, 1943
- Capital: Cabo Pantoja

Government
  - Mayor: Wilson Guerrero Machado

Area
  - Total: 7,363.44 km^{2} (2,843.04 sq mi)
- Elevation: 188 m (617 ft)

Population (2005 census)
  - Total: 5,162
  - Density: 0.7010/km^{2} (1.816/sq mi)
- Time zone: UTC-5 (PET)
- UBIGEO: 160110

Torres Causana District is one of thirteen districts of the Maynas Province in Peru. It is bordered by Ecuador.
