= Yagua language =

Peba–Yaguan language of northeastern Peru

Yagua
- Nijyamïï Nikyejaada
- Native to: Peru, Colombia
- Region: western Amazon
- Ethnicity: Yagua
- Native speakers: (5,700 in Peru cited 2000)
- Language family: Peba–Yaguan: Yagua

Language codes
- ISO 639-3: yad
- Glottolog: yagu1244
- ELP: Yagua
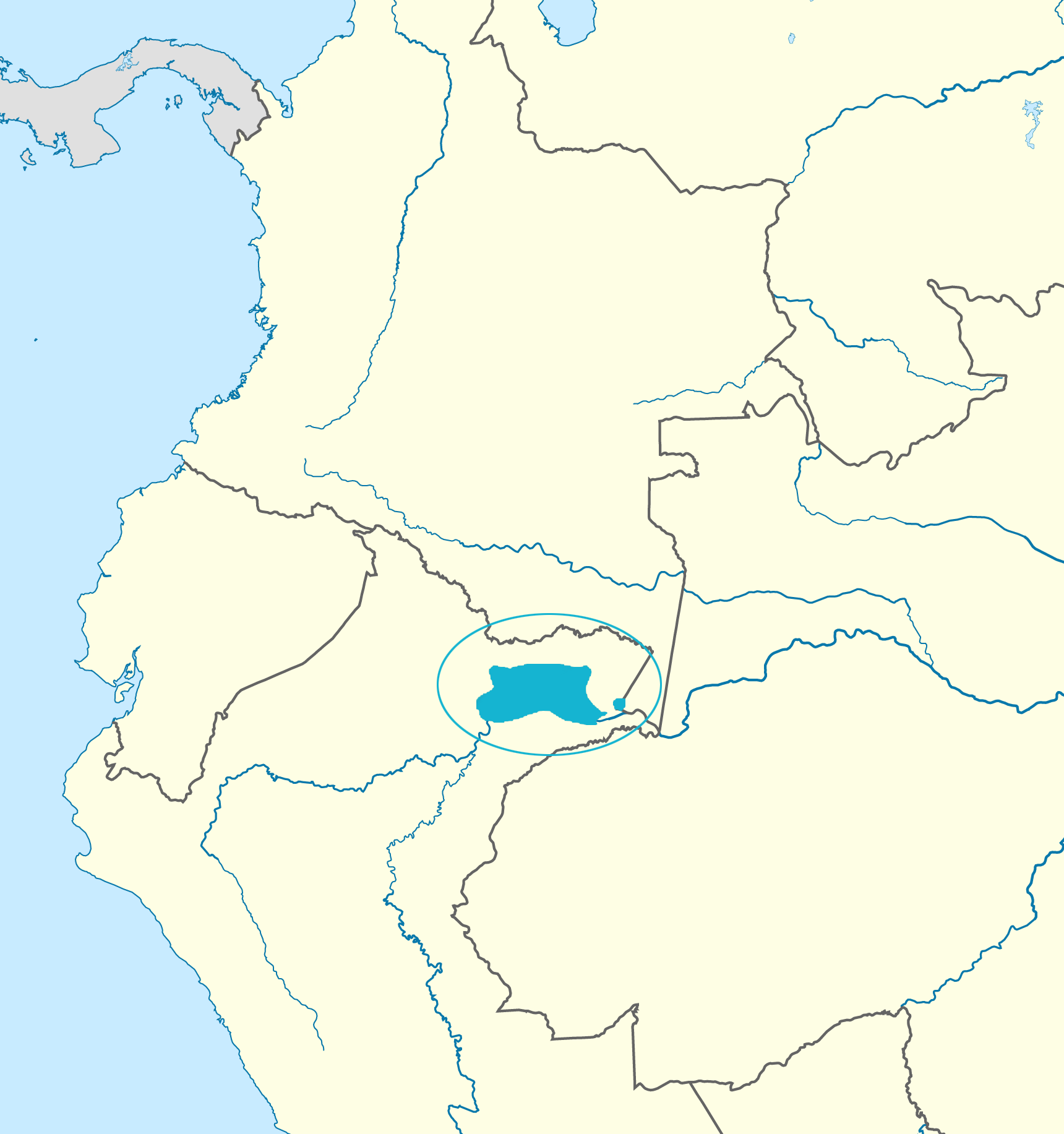

Yagua (/ˈjɑːɡwɑː/ YAH-gwah) is a language spoken primarily in northeastern Peru by the Yagua people. As of 2005, it appears that a few speakers may have migrated across the Peruvian-Colombian border near the town of Leticia. A third of the population is monolingual, and Yagua is the language of instruction in local primary schools.

== Name ==
The exonym is spelled Yagua, Yawa, Yahua, Llagua, Yava, Yegua. They also go by Nijyamïï Nikyejaada.

== Genetic affiliation ==
The Yagua language is a branch of the Peba–Yaguan language family.

== Sociolinguistic situation ==
By the end of the 20th century, there were about 6,000 speakers of the language. At that time, a majority of Yagua individuals were bilingual in both Spanish and the Yagua language. A few distant communities were still largely monolingual, and children were learning the language, though in at least some communities there was parental pressure on children to just speak Spanish. Some ethnic Yaguas are monolingual in Spanish.

There is some degree of semilingualism among certain Yagua women who are culturally assimilated into mainstream Peruvian culture, not having native-like command of either Spanish or Yagua. They contrast with three other groups of Yagua: 1) older women who are fluent Yagua speakers with some degree of Spanish, 2) unassimilated monolingual Yaguas, and 3) men, who all speak Yagua with varying degrees of Spanish fluency. These young women are primarily addressed in Yagua, but respond in a simplified Spanish.

== Phonology ==
Yagua has 6 vowels and 11 consonants, as shown in the chart below. (Orthographic symbols in bold, IPA values in square brackets.)

=== Vowels ===
	Front	Central	Back
Close	**i** [i]	**ɨ** [ɨ]	**u** [u]
Mid	**e** [e]		**o** [ɔ]
Open		**a** [a]	

- Some vowels show a significant degree of allophonic variation, notably /u/ which can be [u], [ʊ] or [o], /i/ which can be [i] or [ɪ], and /a/, which can be [a] or [æ].
- Vowels are both oral and nasal.

=== Consonants ===
	Bilabial	Alveolar	Palatal	Velar	Glottal
Nasal	m	n			
Plosive	p	t	**č** [tʃ]	k	
Fricative		s			h
Tap		**r** [ɾ]			
Approximant	w		**y** [j]		

1. A nasal consonant preceding a nasal vowel is a simple nasal sound ( [m], [n]); but a nasal consonant preceding an oral vowel has an oral release ([mb], [nd])
2. All phones except for /s/, /tʃ/, and /j/ may be palatalized. In addition, bilabial stops may be labialized. /t, n, s/ when palatalized are heard as [tʲ, ɲ, ʃ].
3. /s/ and /tʃ/ show significant allophonic variation, being either pre-stopped or not. Thus /s/ ranges from [s] to [ts], and /tʃ/ ranges from [tʃ] to [ʃ].
4. The rhotic **r** is often retroflex ([ɽ]) and may have some laterality ([ɺ]); simple taps ([ɾ]) are also heard. /r/ can also be realized as [d], especially when palatalized.
5. /w/ can be realized as [β], especially when palatalized.
6. Within a word, there is metathesis of any morpheme-final /j/ with the onset of the following syllable

The language has either tone or a complex pitch-accent system, but this has never been adequately described.

== Morphology ==
The language is highly agglutinative, such that most words consist of multiple morphemes, and a single word may contain more than one root.

== Syntax ==
Most Yagua sentences begin with the verb, followed by the subject and object in that order (VSO). It is a "double object" language, with no known syntactic differences between the two objects of verbs like 'give', for example, or applied objects.

The language has numerous postpositions (and no prepositions, which is generally unexpected for VSO languages). There are over 40 noun classifiers, and essentially no "adjectives". Nouns are modified either by nouns, by classifiers, or by other suffixes.

Yagua uses adjective-like nouns as adjectives. The problem then occurs in a sentence like the red hen, which would be more like "the red one, the hen". Both "the red one" and "the hen" could be the head of the noun phrase. This is solved by determining which of the two nouns persists in the following discourse. If "the red one" persists, then "red" is the head; if "the hen" persists, then "hen" is the head. The order of elements is sensitive to determining the head.

The language is documented in various works by Paul Powlison, Esther Powlison, Doris L. Payne, and Thomas E. Payne.

== Vocabulary ==
Yagua has a quinary (base 5) counting system. Different numbers are used for inanimate objects/counting and animate objects (see measure word).

#	Inanimate/Counting	Animate	#	Inanimate/Counting	Animate
1	tárakí	tíkí	6	tárakínihyátee	tíkinihyátee
2	dárahúy	dánuhúy	7	dárahúnihyátee	dánuhunihyátee
3	múmurí	múuváy	8	múmurínihyátee	múúványihyátee
4	dáryahúyu	dányuhúyu	9	dáryahúyunihyátee	dányuhúyunihyátee
5	tádahyó	tádahyó	10	βuyahúy	βuyahúy

== Bibliography ==
- Payne, Doris L. (1985). Aspects of the Grammar of Yagua: A Typological Perspective (Peru) (PhD thesis). University of California at Los Angeles. ISBN 979-8-204-40865-4.
- Payne, Doris L. (1986). "Basic word order in Yagua". In Derbyshire, Desmond; Pullum, Geoffrey (eds.). Handbook of Amazonian Languages. Vol. 1. Berlin: Mouton.
- Payne, Doris L. (1990). The Pragmatics of Word Order: Typological Dimensions of Verb-initial Languages. Berlin and New York: Mouton.
- Payne, Doris L. (October 2007). Seifart, Frank; Payne, Doris L. (eds.). "Source of the Yagua Nominal Classification System". International Journal of American Linguistics. 73 (4): 447–474. doi:10.1086/523773.
- Payne, Thomas E. (1994). The Twins Stories: Participant Coding in Yagua Narrative. University of California Publications in Linguistics. Vol. 120. Berkeley: University of California Press. ISBN 0520097742.
- Payne, Thomas E. (1997). Describing morphosyntax: A guide for field linguists. Cambridge: Cambridge University Press. ISBN 978-0-521-58805-8.
- Powlison, Paul; Powlison, Esther (1958). El sistema numérico del yagua (in Spanish).
