= Napo District =

Coordinates: 2.4888°S 73.6793°W

- District
- Interactive map of Napo District
- Country: Peru
- Region: Loreto
- Province: Maynas
- Founded: July 2, 1943
- Capital: Santa Clotilde

Government
  - Mayor: Rogerio Quevedo Rivadeneyra

Area
  - Total: 24,298.1 km^{2} (9,381.5 sq mi)
- Elevation: 100 m (330 ft)

Population (2005 census)
  - Total: 15,097
  - Density: 0.62132/km^{2} (1.6092/sq mi)
- Time zone: UTC-5 (PET)
- UBIGEO: 160107

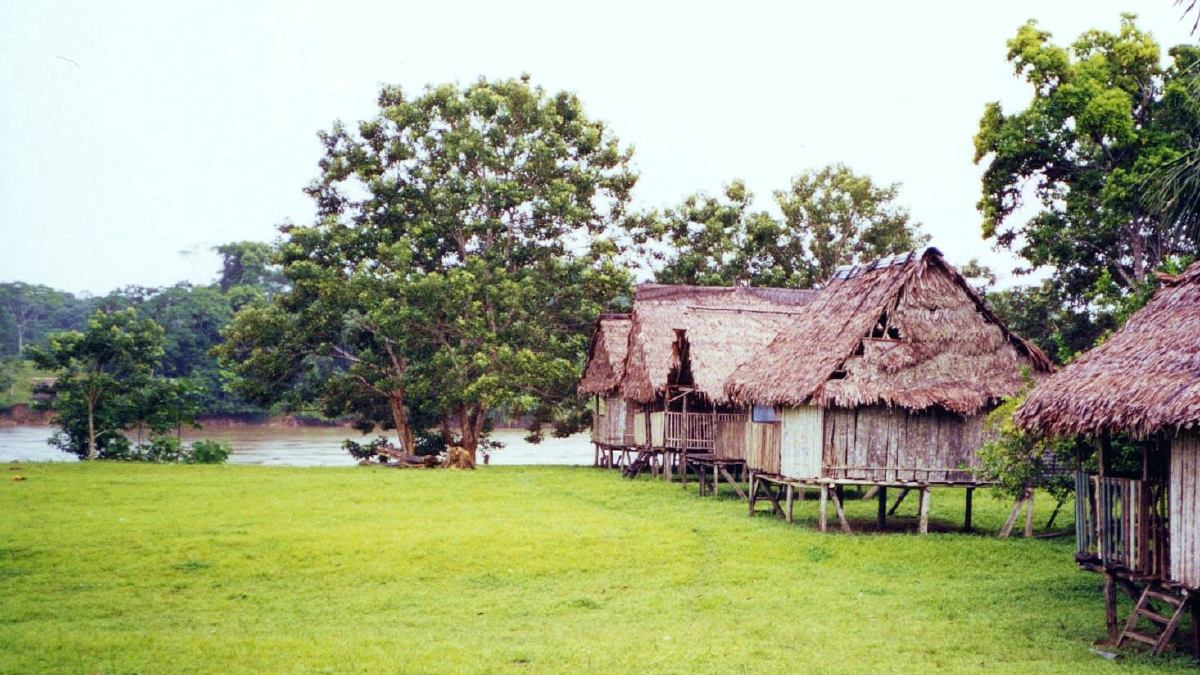

Napo District is one of thirteen districts of the Maynas Province in Peru.

== Climate ==
Climate data for Santa Clotilde, Napo, elevation 118 m (387 ft), (1991–2020)
Month	Jan	Feb	Mar	Apr	May	Jun	Jul	Aug	Sep	Oct	Nov	Dec	Year
Mean daily maximum °C (°F)	31.6 (88.9)	31.6 (88.9)	31.5 (88.7)	31.1 (88.0)	30.6 (87.1)	30.1 (86.2)	30.3 (86.5)	31.5 (88.7)	32.3 (90.1)	32.3 (90.1)	32.0 (89.6)	31.8 (89.2)	31.4 (88.5)
Mean daily minimum °C (°F)	22.5 (72.5)	22.5 (72.5)	22.6 (72.7)	22.6 (72.7)	22.4 (72.3)	22.1 (71.8)	21.7 (71.1)	21.5 (70.7)	22.0 (71.6)	22.4 (72.3)	22.5 (72.5)	22.4 (72.3)	22.3 (72.1)
Average precipitation mm (inches)	217.2 (8.55)	202.8 (7.98)	285.8 (11.25)	263.8 (10.39)	267.0 (10.51)	209.0 (8.23)	193.9 (7.63)	165.9 (6.53)	168.0 (6.61)	170.6 (6.72)	197.6 (7.78)	237.6 (9.35)	2,579.2 (101.53)
Source: National Meteorology and Hydrology Service of Peru
