= Güeppi-Sekime National Park =

National park in Peru

- IUCN category II (national park)
- Location within Peru
- Location: Peru; Putumayo Province, Loreto
- Coordinates: 0.48°S 74.91°W
- Area: 2,036 km^{2} (786 mi^{2})
- Established: 2012
- Governing body: SERNANP
- Website: Parque Nacional Güeppi-Sekime

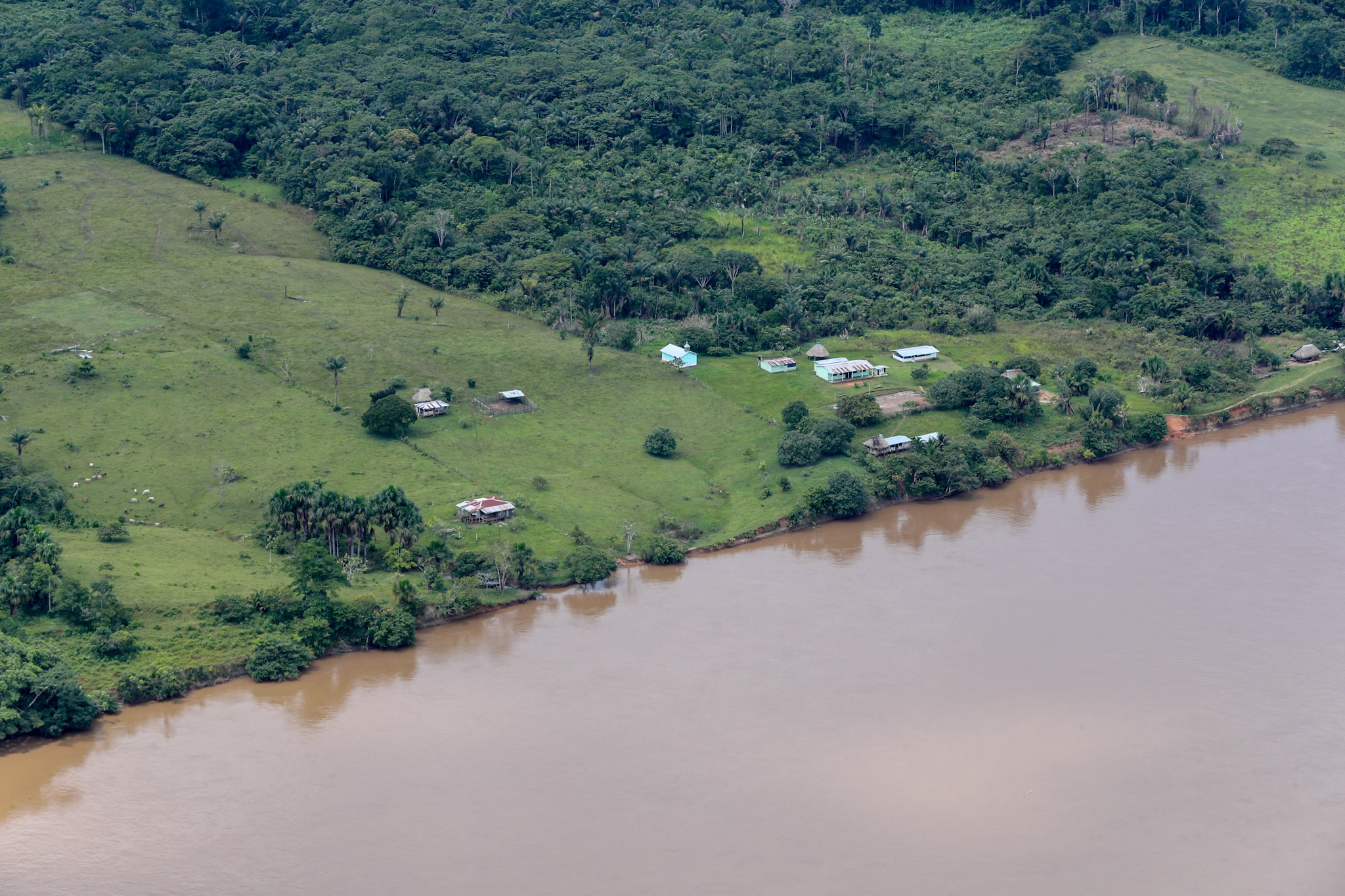
Güeppi-Sekime National Park

Güeppi-Sekime National Park is a protected area located in the Peruvian region of Loreto, on the border with Ecuador. The park encompasses 203,628.51 hectares (2,036 km^{2}) of forests in a landscape that features hills and seasonally flooded lowlands.

== History ==
The Güeppi Reserved Zone was established in March 1997, initially covering 6,260 km^{2} (2,420 mi^{2}). The name and the extension were modified and was granted a national park status in 2012.

== Climate ==
The park has a warm and humid climate, with an average temperature of 25.5 °C (77.9 °F) and precipitation between 2500 and 2800 mm.

== Ecology ==
=== Flora ===
Among the plant species found in the area are: Socratea exorrhiza, Brownea grandiceps, Calyptranthes bipennis, Salvinia auriculata, Cedrela odorata, Phenakospermum guyannense, Mabea speciosa, Ilex inundata, Warszewiczia coccinea, Ocotea javitensis, Caryocar glabrum, Piper obliquum, Pourouma cecropiifolia, Handroanthus serratifolius, Genipa spruceana, Annona spp., Lecythis ampla, Ophiocaryon heterophyllum, Dieffenbachia parvifolia, Minquartia guianensis, Hymenachne donacifolia, Astrocaryum murumuru, Ficus schippii, Calathea spp., Cedrelinga cateniformis, Hevea guianensis, Trichomanes pinnatum, Miconia spp., Virola surinamensis, Mauritia flexuosa, Tapirira guianensis, etc.

=== Fauna ===
There is a large diversity of birds and reptiles such as the black caiman (Melansosuchus niger). It is also home to several endangered species such as the jaguar (Panther onca) and the giant otter (Pteronura brasuliensis). This is also a site of the pink river dolphin (Inia geoffrensis), endangered by being used as bait in fishing for mota fish (Calophysus macropterus), despite such practices being illegal.

Birds found in the area include: the golden-green woodpecker, the sunbittern, the king vulture, the undulated tinamou, the green ibis, the harpy eagle, the white-necked jacobin, the white-throated toucan, the red-and-green macaw, the red-throated caracara, the muscovy duck, the agami heron, etc.

== Anthropology ==
Native peoples living within this region include the Quichua, the Secoya and the Bora.
