= Napo River =

River of Ecuador

Napo river
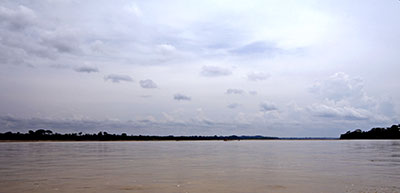
- The Napo River to the east of Coca

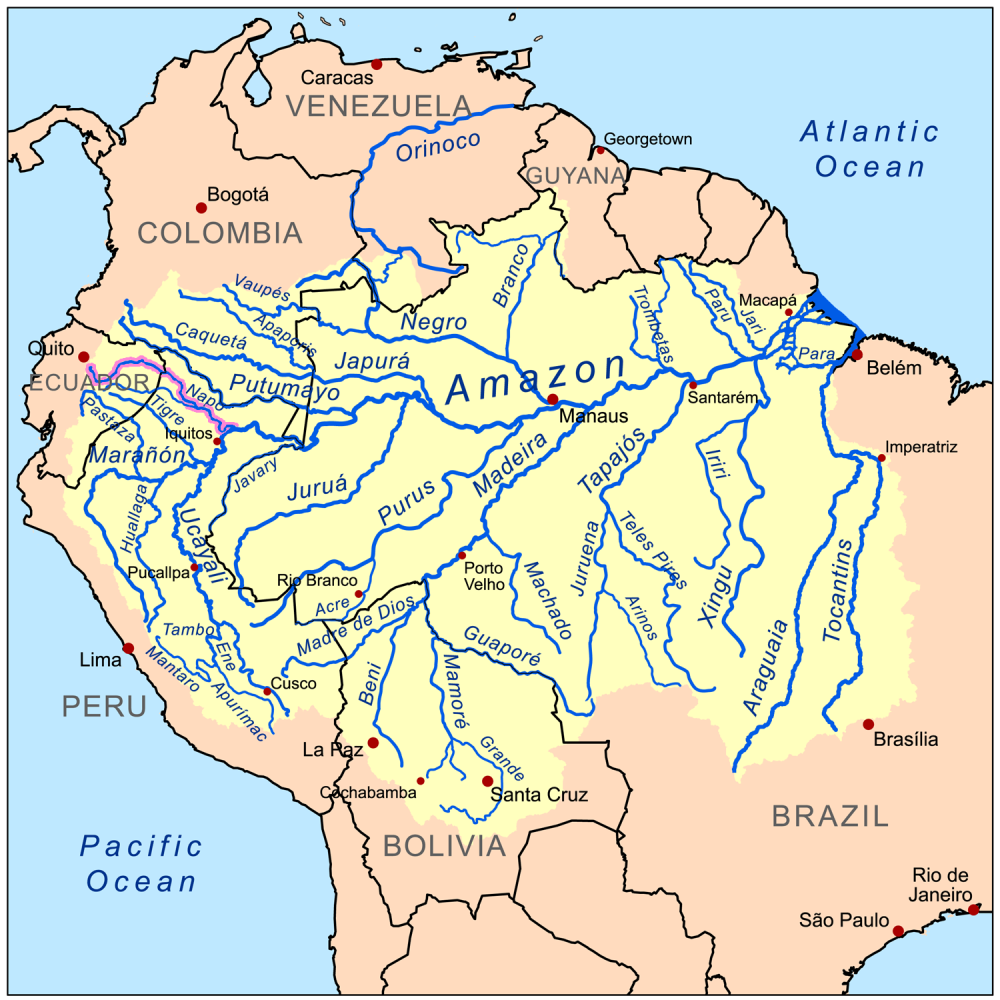
- Map of the Amazon Basin with the Napo River highlighted

Location
- Countries: Ecuador; Peru

Physical characteristics
- Source
  - location: Confluence of Jatunyaçu and Anzu, Ecuador
  - coordinates: 1°2′49″S 77°48′27″W
  - elevation: 430 m (1,410 ft)
- 2nd source
  - location: Jatunyaçu–Verdeyaçu, Andes, Ecuador
  - coordinates: 0°38′23″S 78°3′29″W
  - elevation: 3,419 m (11,217 ft)
- 3rd source
  - location: Jatunyaçu–Mulatos, Andes, Ecuador
  - coordinates: 0°53′55″S 78°24′33″W
  - elevation: 3,871 m (12,700 ft)
- 4th source
  - location: Anzu River, Andes, Ecuador
  - coordinates: 1°23′09″S 78°5′18″W
  - elevation: 1,430 m (4,690 ft)
- Mouth: Amazon River
  - location: 70 km (43 mi) downstream from Iquitos, Loreto Region, Peru
  - coordinates: 3°27′28″S 72°43′3″W
  - elevation: 78 m (256 ft)
- Length: 1,130 km (700 mi)
- Basin size: 103,307.79 km^{2} (39,887.36 mi^{2})
- Discharge
  - location: Francisco de Orellana (near mouth)
  - average: (Period: 1971–2000)7,147.8 m^{3}/s (252,420 cu ft/s)
  - minimum: 3,200 m^{3}/s (110,000 cu ft/s)
  - maximum: 10,800 m^{3}/s (380,000 cu ft/s)
- Discharge
  - location: Mazán (Bella Vista)
  - average: (Period: 1991–2023)7,000 m^{3}/s (250,000 cu ft/s)
  - minimum: 3,250 m^{3}/s (115,000 cu ft/s)
  - maximum: 11,200 m^{3}/s (400,000 cu ft/s)
- Discharge
  - location: Santa Clotilde
  - average: (Period: 2002–2011)5,895 m^{3}/s (208,200 cu ft/s)
- Discharge
  - location: Nueva Rocafuerte
  - average: (Period: 2001–2009)2,032 m^{3}/s (71,800 cu ft/s)
- Discharge
  - location: Puerto Francisco de Orellana
  - average: (Period: 2001–2009)1,105 m^{3}/s (39,000 cu ft/s)

Basin features
- Progression: Amazon → Atlantic Ocean
- River system: Amazon River
- Tributaries
  - left: Jatunyaçu, Misahualli, Payamino, Coca, Aguarico, Tamboyaçu
  - right: Anzu, Llocullón, Tiputini, Yasuní, Anahiri, Curaray, Tacshacuraray, Mazán

The Napo River (Spanish: Río Napo) is a tributary to the Amazon River that rises in Ecuador on the flanks of the east Andean volcanoes of Antisana, Sincholagua and Cotopaxi.

The total length is 1,075 km (668 mi). The river drains an area of ca 103,000 km^{2}. The mean annual discharge at Mazán is 6,800 m^{3}/s (240,000 cu ft/s).

== Geography ==
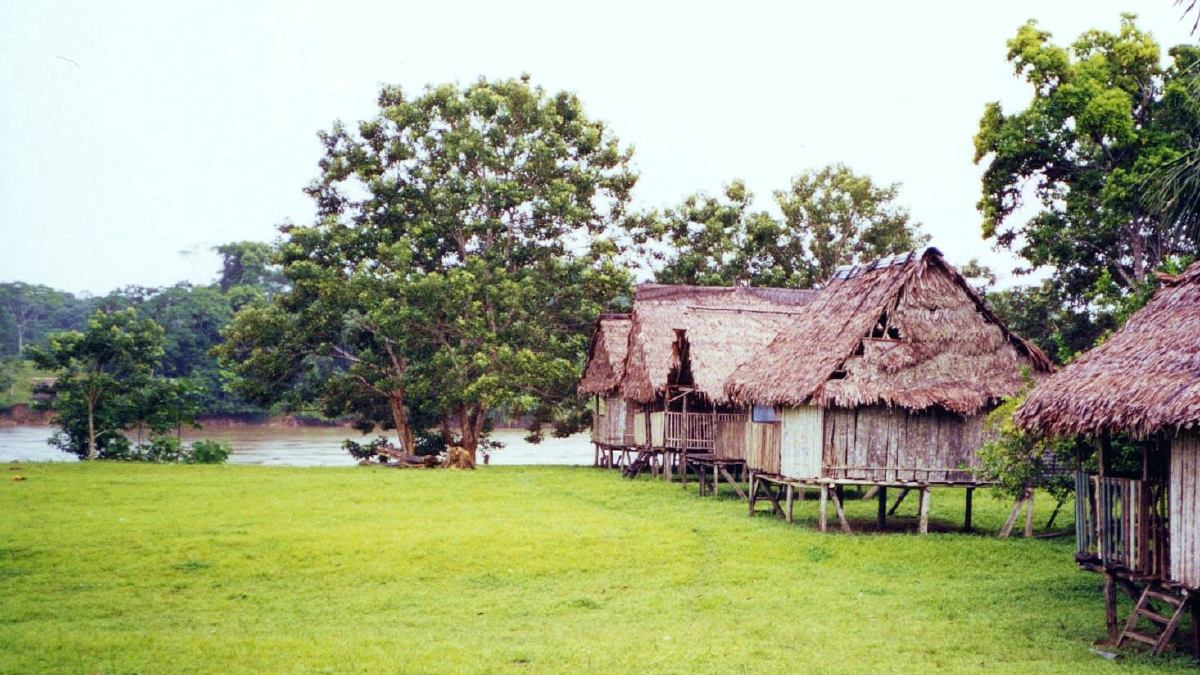
Village along the west bank of Napo River in Peru, a few miles above confluence with the Amazon. The land visible beyond the waterway is an island in the river.

Before it reaches the plains it receives a great number of small streams from impenetrable, saturated and much broken mountainous districts, where the dense and varied vegetation seems to fight for every piece of ground. From the north it is joined by the Coca River, having its sources in the gorges of Cayambe volcano on the equator, and also a powerful river, the Aguarico having its headwaters between Cayambe and the Colombia frontier. From the west, it receives a secondary tributary, the Curaray, from the Andean slopes, between Cotopaxi and the Tungurahua volcano. From its Coca branch to the mouth of the Curaray the Napo is full of snags and shelving sandbanks and throws out numerous channels among jungle-tangled islands, which in the wet season are flooded, giving the river an immense width. From the Coca to the Amazon it runs through a forested plain where not a hill is visible from the river - its uniformly level banks being only interrupted by swamps and lagoons. From the Amazon the Napo is navigable for river craft up to its Curaray branch, a distance of about 216 miles (348 km), and perhaps a bit further; thence, by painful canoe navigation, its upper waters may be ascended as far as Santa Rosa, the usual point of embarkation for any venturesome traveller who descends from the Quito tableland. The Coca river may be penetrated as far up as its middle course, where it is jammed between two mountain walls, in a deep canyon, along which it dashes over high falls and numerous reefs. This is the stream made famous by the expedition of the Spanish conquistador Gonzalo Pizarro.

Hydrometric stations on the Napo River:

Station	River kilometer (rkm)	Elevation (m)	Drainage basin (km^{2})	Average discharge (m^{3}/s)	
Lower Napo
Francisco de Orellana	0	78	103,307.79	7,147.8	6,611
Mazán	79.76	85	100,518	7,033	6,464.5
Bellavista	194.51	105	90,305.3	6,416.1	–
Santa Clotilde	256.24	113	85,770	6,124.4	5,700
Campo Serio	421.35	140	50,342.9	3,430.3	–
Cabo Pantoja	546.8	166	44,698.2	3,007.5	3,280
Nuevo Rocafuerte	574.1	173	27,489.4	1,937.3	2,032
Pañacocha	673	203	21,731.4	1,552.1	–
Upper Napo
Puerto Francisco de Orellana	782	243	12,343	1,016	1,105
Puerto Napo	950	427	4,182.4	260.9	377.6

== Discharge ==
Napo River at Bellavista average (Q), dominante (Q_{d}) discharge (m^{3}/s) and sediment load (S – million ton/year). Period from 1991/09–2009/08:

Water year	Q	S	Q_{d}	Water year	Q	S	Q_{d}
1991/1992	5,667	28.608	6,009	2001/2002	5,979	32.431	6,335
1992/1993	7,104	47.718	7,447	2002/2003	5,669	32.154	6,312
1993/1994	8,013	67.159	8,583	2003/2004	6,148	41.916	7,054
1994/1995	6,055	34.801	6,525	2004/2005	6,456	37.953	6,767
1995/1996	5,956	34.017	6,463	2005/2006	6,143	34.77	6,523
1996/1997	6,262	38.258	6,790	2006/2007	6,535	40.344	6,942
1997/1998	9,839	105.956	10,354	2007/2008	6,615	40.832	6,977
1998/1999	6,839	51.48	7,686	2008/2009	7,428	52.504	7,749
1999/2000	6,725	49.735	7,576				
2000/2001	6,452	38.527	6,810	Average	6,660	44.953	7,161

Napo River at Bellavista average, minimum and maximum discharge (m^{3}/s). Period from 2009/09 to 2023/08:

Water year	Mean	Min	Max	Water year	Mean	Min	Max
2009/2010	7,177			2016/2017	7,273.6	3,200	11,150
2010/2011	5,768.2	1,649	10,860	2017/2018	7,284	1,550	13,500
2011/2012	7,447.4	2,894	12,230	2018/2019	8,234	2,850	12,200
2012/2013	7,452.7	3,102	11,230	2019/2020	8,100	3,100	12,700
2013/2014	8,652	3,230	13,700	2020/2021	8,410	3,620	14,000
2014/2015	9,336	4,810	13,450	2021/2022	6,855	2,078	13,500
2015/2016	5,761	498.6	10,200	2022/2023	5,849	1,201	15,200

Minimum 498.6 m^{3}/s (2016/02); Maximum: 15,820 m^{3}/s (2015/07)

Napo River at Bellavista average, maximum, minimum and multiannual average (normal) discharge (m^{3}/s) and anomaly (%):

	Mean	Max	Min	Normal	(%)
2010/09 – 2011/08
SEP	2,620.5	3,089	1,969	5,121.2	–49
OCT	2,413.5	3,061	1,649	4,898.6	–51
NOV	3,818.7	4,778	2,696	5,595.1	–32
DEC	4,774.1	6,240	4,148	5,660.6	–16
JAN	3,604.2	5,001	2,174	4,580.7	–21
FEB	2,480.7	3,478	1,920	4,386.9	–43
MAR	4,753.4	7,127	3,790	5,824.1	–18
APR	9,206.8	10,240	7,865	7,502.4	23
MAY	9,561.5	10,040	8,348	8,941.3	7
JUN	10,193.8	10,860	8,821	9,422.9	8
JUL	9,846.3	10,590	7,904	8,844.7	11
AUG	5,944.6	8,658	3,758	6,610.8	–10
Mean	5,768.2	6,930	4,587	6,449.1	–12
2011/09 – 2012/08
SEP	4,551.3	5,441	3,757	5,121.2	11
OCT	5,344.9	6,995	2,894	4,898.6	9
NOV	4,427	6,878	3,023	5,595.1	–21
DEC	6,536.8	9,160	5,205	5,660.6	15
JAN	7,998.7	9,501	4,868	4,580.7	75
FEB	6,536.8	8,302	5,155	4,386.9	49
MAR	9,557.2	12,150	5,417	5,824.1	64
APR	11,843.7	12,230	10,870	7,502.4	58
MAY	10,322.7	10,790	9,702	8,941.3	15
JUN	8,878.8	9,961	7,011	9,422.9	–6
JUL	8,189.3	9,228	7,197	8,844.7	–7
AUG	5,182	7,605	3,975	6,612.4	–22
Mean	7,447.4	9,020	5,756	6,449.2	15.5
2012/09 – 2013/08
SEP	5,037	7,822	3,249	5,096	–1
OCT	5,113	6,457	4,632	4,918	4
NOV	4,130	5,660	3,102	5,567	–26
DEC	4,755	6,838	3,568	5,698	–17
JAN	7,589	9,183	3,854	4,723	61
FEB	5,851	9,071	4,170	4,465	31
MAR	10,060	10,740	9,127	5,973	68
APR	9,405	10610	8,675	7,683	22
MAY	8,322	10,570	6,932	8,999	–8
JUN	10,495	11,230	9,743	9,400	12
JUL	9,675	10,410	8,402	8,817	10
AUG	9,001	9,776	8,386	6,551	37
Mean	7,452.7	9,030	6,153	6,490.8	15

Napo River average discharge:
Period	Discharge	Ref.
Francisco de Orellana (near mouth) 3°27′28″S 72°43′3″W
2010–2015	7,400 m^{3}/s (260,000 cu ft/s)	
	7,500 m^{3}/s (260,000 cu ft/s)	
1971–2000	7,147.8 m^{3}/s (252,420 cu ft/s)	
	8,936 m^{3}/s (315,600 cu ft/s)	
	4,555.23 m^{3}/s (160,866 cu ft/s)	
Bellavista (Mazán)
1930–2006	6,464 m^{3}/s (228,300 cu ft/s)	
1981–2020	6,800 m^{3}/s (240,000 cu ft/s)	
1989–2010	6,360 m^{3}/s (225,000 cu ft/s) (Q–dominante: 6,865 m^{3}/s (242,400 cu ft/s)	
1991–2009	6,660 m^{3}/s (235,000 cu ft/s)	
1997–2015	6,734.2 m^{3}/s (237,820 cu ft/s)	
2000–2011	6,461 m^{3}/s (228,200 cu ft/s)	
2001–2012	6,758 m^{3}/s (238,700 cu ft/s)	
2001–2009	6,369 m^{3}/s (224,900 cu ft/s)	
2002–2008	6,489 m^{3}/s (229,200 cu ft/s)	
2003–2009	6,855 m^{3}/s (242,100 cu ft/s)	
2004–2010	6,609 m^{3}/s (233,400 cu ft/s)	
2001–2005	6,976 m^{3}/s (246,400 cu ft/s)	
2004–2006	6,267 m^{3}/s (221,300 cu ft/s)	
2016–2017	9,338 m^{3}/s (329,800 cu ft/s)	
1971–2000	7,032 m^{3}/s (248,300 cu ft/s)	

== Tributaries ==
List of the major tributaries of the Napo River (from the mouth upwards):

Left tributary	Right tributary	Length (km)	Basin size (km^{2})	^{*}Average discharge (m^{3}/s)
Napo		1,089.03	103,307.79	7,147.8
Lower Napo
Sucusari			590.7	39.8
	Mazán	509.11	7,721.3	532.9
Yanayaçu			1,340	89
Zapote			140.8	9.3
Papaya			278	17.5
	Tacshacuraray	203.1	2,760.5	196.5
	Huirina		610	33.2
Tamboryaçu			4,958	327.2
	Pucara		827	50.4
	Curaray	772.77	26,704.7	2,044.4
Tarapoto			679	46.1
	Gomez		424.8	32.6
Loro Caparin			794.1	61.8
	Anshiri		2,682.5	202.1
Santa Maria			1,471.5	107.8
Aguarico		502.5	13,404.5	889.3
	Yasuní	238.5	3,386.8	237.7
	Tiputini	380.4	4,423.1	320.2
	Huiririma			13.2
	Cariyuturi		253.5	18.3
Pañyaçu		80	876.7	68.4
	Indillana	71.8	636.3	51.5
Itaya			120.6	9.6
Jivino		121.7	707.9	56
Blanco			249	17.6
Coca		245.1	5,308.1	338.9
Upper Napo
Payamino		110.4	2,012.6	171.2
Suyunoyaçu			198.8	16.8
Suno		96.7	1,891.4	161.2
	Arajuno		835.9	97.9
Pusuno			160.2	15.2
Misahuallí		68.7	1,659.6	170.6
Jatunyaçu		107	3,221.2	302.7
	Anzu	69.7	817.1	75

^{*}Period: 1971–2000

== See also ==
- Lake Pilchicocha
