= Mazán District =

Coordinates: 3.4958°S 73.0955°W

- District
- Interactive map of Mazán District
- Country: Peru
- Region: Loreto
- Province: Maynas
- Founded: July 2, 1943
- Capital: Mazán

Government
  - Mayor: Edward Reátegui

Area
  - Total: 9,922.45 km^{2} (3,831.08 sq mi)
- Elevation: 108 m (354 ft)

Population (2005 census)
  - Total: 13,573
  - Density: 1.3679/km^{2} (3.5429/sq mi)
- Time zone: UTC-5 (PET)
- UBIGEO: 160106

Mazán District is one of thirteen districts of the Maynas Province in Peru.

== Climate ==
Climate data for Mazán, elevation 96 m (315 ft), (1991–2020)
Month	Jan	Feb	Mar	Apr	May	Jun	Jul	Aug	Sep	Oct	Nov	Dec	Year
Mean daily maximum °C (°F)	31.6 (88.9)	31.6 (88.9)	31.8 (89.2)	31.3 (88.3)	31.1 (88.0)	30.8 (87.4)	30.8 (87.4)	31.9 (89.4)	32.5 (90.5)	32.4 (90.3)	32.1 (89.8)	31.7 (89.1)	31.6 (88.9)
Mean daily minimum °C (°F)	22.3 (72.1)	22.2 (72.0)	22.3 (72.1)	22.4 (72.3)	22.2 (72.0)	21.8 (71.2)	21.3 (70.3)	21.8 (71.2)	22.2 (72.0)	22.4 (72.3)	22.5 (72.5)	22.2 (72.0)	22.1 (71.8)
Average precipitation mm (inches)	251.1 (9.89)	241.2 (9.50)	340.3 (13.40)	287.7 (11.33)	257.4 (10.13)	197.1 (7.76)	170.1 (6.70)	152.5 (6.00)	155.2 (6.11)	210.2 (8.28)	246.2 (9.69)	312.3 (12.30)	2,821.3 (111.09)
Source: National Meteorology and Hydrology Service of Peru
