= Peba language =

Extinct Peba–Yaguan language of Peru

Peba
- Nijamvo
- Native to: NE Peru
- Region: western Amazon
- Extinct: (date missing)
- Language family: Peba–Yaguan: Peba

Language codes
- ISO 639-3: None (mis)
- Glottolog: peba1243

Peba (Peva) is an extinct language from the Peba–Yaguan language family once spoken in Peru. The language is poorly attested and is known from just two wordlists, one collected by Francis de Castelnau and the other by J. Erben.

== Dialects ==
Peba dialects are Cauwachi, Caumari, and Pacaya according to the American anthropologist and linguist John Alden Mason (1950).

== History ==
=== Documentation ===
Peba is attested in only two wordlists. One was colected by Francis de Castelnau and published in 1851, and the other was collected by J. Erben and published in 1948. Castelnau also docuemented the closely related Yagua language; his wordlist has around 100 words for body parts, geographic and cultural lexemes, names of flora and fauna, and numerals. Erben recorded only 21 words in Peba, which encompass numerals, names for animals, and cultural vocabulary. Čestmír Loukotka took words from both wordlists and republished small excerpts from them in 1963.

== Phonology and orthography ==
Castelnau used the letters ⟨p, k, t, m, n, s, ch, r, l, w, j⟩ to transcribe his Peba wordlist. Presumably the letter ⟨ch⟩ represents the postalveolar fricative [ʃ] due to Castelnau's French background. The letter ⟨r⟩ is problematic; it is not interpreted as a uvular fricative as it is in French, presumably reflecting a tap or trill consonant like in Spanish. The letter ⟨l⟩ is considered to have the same value as it does in the IPA, though it is an allophone of /n/. Peba has five vowels ⟨a,e,i,o,u⟩, with the same value as in the IPA. The vowel ⟨o⟩ is very rare in Peba.
