= Putumayo province =

Coordinates: 4°34′12″S 73°46′48″W

Putumayo
- Province
- Location of Putumayo in the Loreto Region
- Putumayo Province
- Country: Peru
- Region: Loreto
- Capital: San Antonio del Estrecho

Government
  - Mayor: Humberto Fuentes Tello (2019-2022)

Area
  - Total: 45,927.89 km^{2} (17,732.86 sq mi)
- Elevation: 111 m (364 ft)

Population
  - Total: 7,780
  - Density: 0.169/km^{2} (0.439/sq mi)
- UBIGEO: 1608

Putumayo is one of the eight provinces in the Loreto Region of Peru. The capital of the province is the town of San Antonio del Estrecho.

== History ==
It was created by Law N° 30186, on May 5, 2014, in President Ollanta Humala's term.

== Political division ==
The province is divided into four districts.

1. Putumayo
2. Rosa Panduro
3. Yaguas
4. Teniente Manuel Clavero
