= Deforestation by continent =

Removal of forests worldwide

In decades since 1990, South America and Africa have shown the greatest loss of forest area, with global net loss in the 2010s still about 60% of the 1990s value.

Rates and causes of deforestation vary from region to region around the world. In 2009, two-thirds of the world's forests were located in just 10 countries: Russia, Brazil, Canada, the United States, China, Australia, the Democratic Republic of the Congo, Indonesia, India, and Peru.

Global annual deforestation is estimated to total 13.7 million hectares a year, similar to the area of Greece. Half of the area experiencing deforestation consists of new forests or forest growth. In addition to direct human-induced deforestation, growing forests have also been affected by climate change. The Kyoto Protocol includes an agreement to prevent deforestation, but does not stipulate actions to fulfil it.

The rate of global tree cover loss has approximately doubled since 2001, to an annual loss approaching an area the size of Italy.

Home to much of the Amazon rainforest, Brazil's tropical primary (old-growth) forest loss greatly exceeds that of other countries.

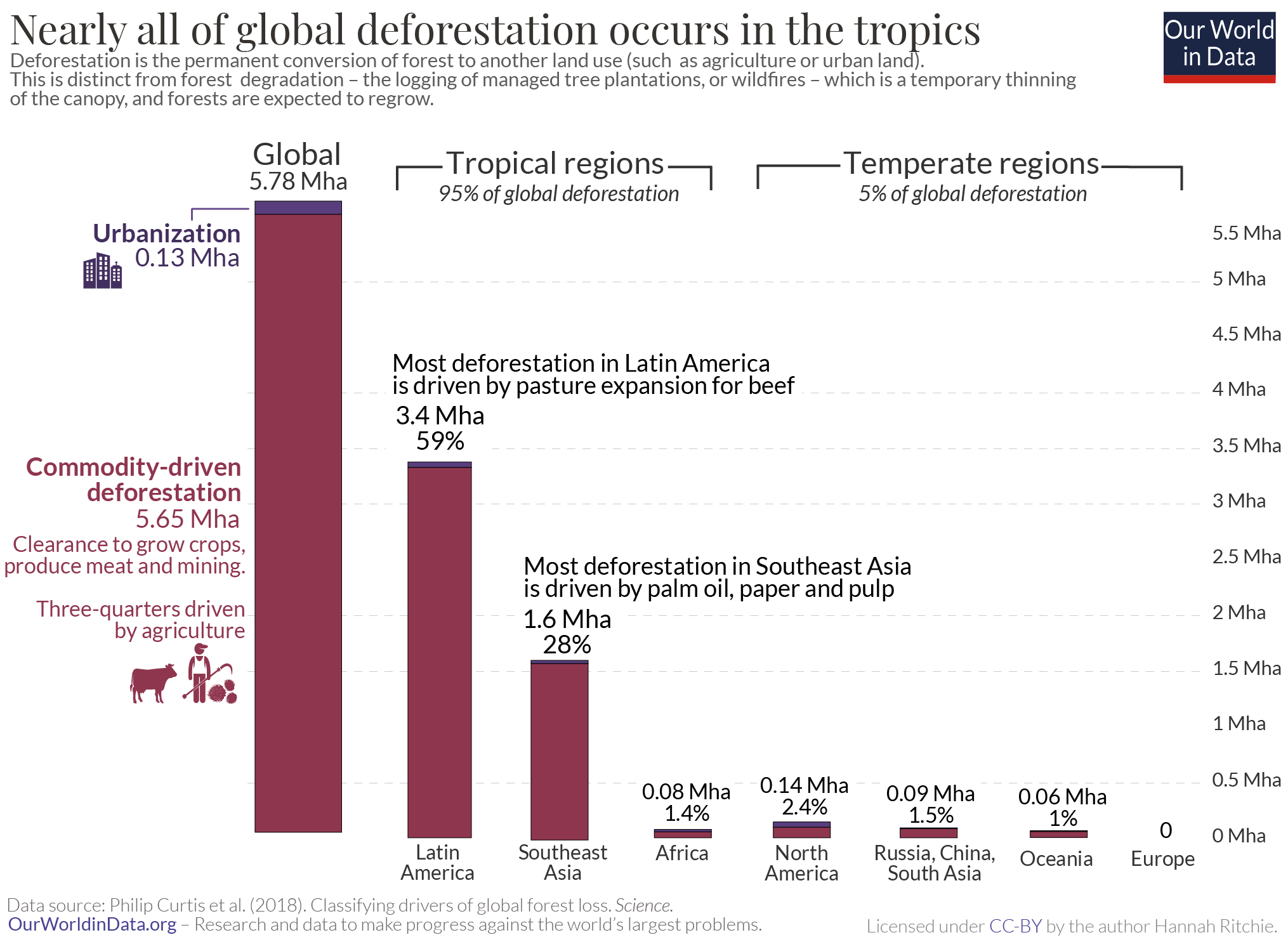
A large percentage of global deforestation occurs in the tropics.

== Africa ==
By 2008, deforestation in Africa was estimated to be occurring at twice the world average rate, according to the United Nations Environment Programme (UNEP). Some sources claim that deforestation has already wiped out roughly 90% of West Africa's original forests. Today, deforestation is accelerating in Central Africa. According to the United Nations' Food and Agriculture Organization (FAO), Africa lost the highest percentage of tropical forests of any continent during the 1980s, 1990s, and early 2000s. According to the figures from the FAO (1997), only 22.8% of West Africa's moist forests remain, much of them degraded. Nigeria has lost 81% of its old-growth forests in just 15 years (1990–2005).

Mass deforestation threatens food security in some African countries. One factor contributing to the continent's high deforestation rates is the dependence of 90% of its population on wood as fuel for heating and cooking. Research carried out by the World Wide Fund for Nature (WWF) in 2006 shows that rates of illegal logging in Africa vary from 50% in Cameroon and Equatorial Guinea to 70% in Gabon and 80% in Liberia, where timber revenues played a major role in financing the Sierra Leone Civil War and other regional armed conflicts until the UN Security Council imposed a ban on all Liberian timber in 2003.

=== The Democratic Republic of the Congo ===
Deforestation in the Democratic Republic of the Congo has been caused partly by unregulated logging and mining, but mostly by the demands made by the subsistence activities of a poor population. In the east of the country, for example, more than 3 million people live less than a day's walk from Virunga National Park. Wood from the park's forests is used by many of those people as firewood, lumber for construction, and for the production of charcoal. Deforestation caused by subsistence farming is an acute threat to the park in general, and the habitat of the critically endangered mountain gorilla in particular. From 2014 to 2018, the rate of tree-felling in the Democratic Republic of Congo doubled.

=== Ethiopia ===
The main cause of deforestation in the East African country of Ethiopia is a growing population and subsequent higher demand for agriculture, livestock production, and biofuel. Other reasons include low education and inactivity from the government, although the current government has taken some steps to tackle deforestation. Organizations such as Farm Africa are working with the federal and local governments to create a system of forest management. Ethiopia, the second largest country in Africa by population, has been hit by famine many times because of shortages of rain and depletion of natural resources. Deforestation has lowered the chance of getting rain, which is already low, and increased erosion. Berkeley Bayisa, an Ethiopian farmer, offers one example of why deforestation occurs. He reported that his district was once forested and full of wildlife, but that overpopulation caused people to come and clear it to plant crops, cutting all trees to sell as firewood.

Ethiopia has lost 98% of its forested regions in the last 50 years. At the beginning of the 20th century, around 420,000 km^{2} (160,000 sq mi) or 35% of Ethiopia's land was covered with forests. Recent reports indicate that forests now cover less than 14.2% or even only 11.9% as of 2005. Between 1990 and 2005, the country lost 14% of its forests or 21,000 km^{2} (8,100 sq mi).

=== Kenya ===
In 1963, Kenya had a forest cover of some 10 percent; by 2006, it had only 1.7 percent. Between 2000 and 2020 Kenya experienced a 6% net loss in tree cover, dropping by -285kha (2850000000 m^{2}).

=== Madagascar ===
Deforestation, with resulting desertification, water resource degradation, and soil loss has affected approximately 94% of Madagascar's previously biologically productive lands. Since the arrival of humans 2000 years ago, Madagascar has lost more than 90% of its original forest. Most of this loss has occurred since independence from the French and is the result of local people using slash-and-burn agricultural practices as they try to subsist.

=== Nigeria ===
According to the FAO, Nigeria has the world's highest deforestation rate of primary forests. It has lost more than half of its primary forest in the last five years. The causes cited are logging, subsistence agriculture, and the collection of fuelwood. Almost 90% of West Africa's rainforest has been destroyed.

== Asia ==
=== East Asia ===
==== Japan ====
Yoichi Kuroda sketches a history and current outline of 'large scale land and landscape destruction' due to industrial timber and paper demands.

=== North Asia ===
==== Russia ====
Russia has the largest area of forests of any country on Earth, with around 12 million km^{2} of boreal forest, larger than the Amazon rainforest. Russia's forests contain 55% of the world's conifers and represent 11% of biomass on Earth. It is estimated that 20,000 km^{2} (7,700 sq mi) are deforested each year. Areas nearer to China are most affected, as it is the main source for timber. Deforestation in Russia is particularly damaging as the forests have a short growing season due to extremely cold winters and therefore take longer to recover.

=== South Asia ===
==== India ====
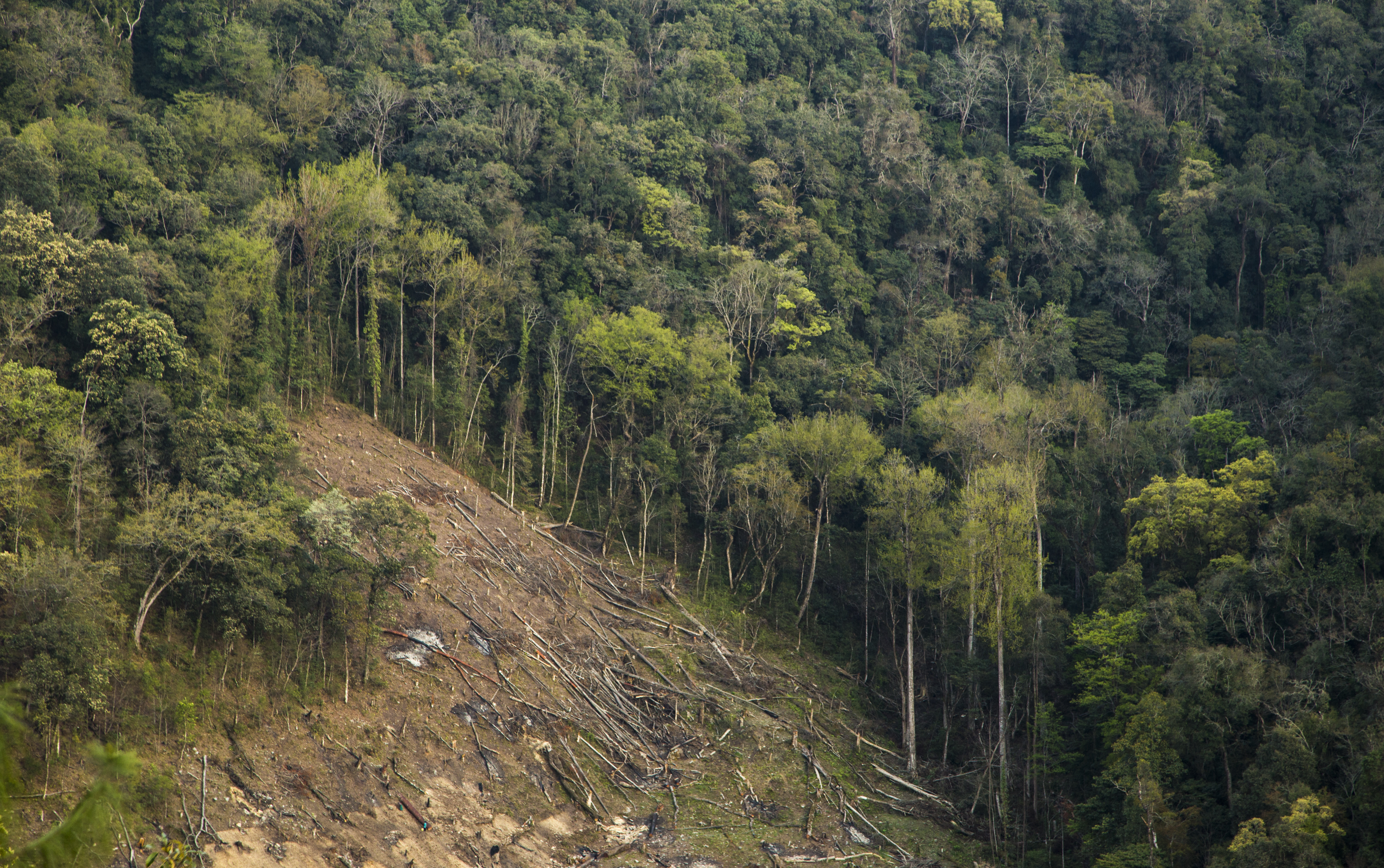
Deforestation in Arunachal Pradesh.

Deforestation in India is the widespread destruction of major forests in India. It is mainly caused by environmental degradation by farmers, ranches, loggers and plantation corporations. In 2009, India ranked 10th worldwide in the amount of forest loss, where world annual deforestation is estimated as 13.7 million hectares (34×10^{6} acres) a year.

==== Sri Lanka ====
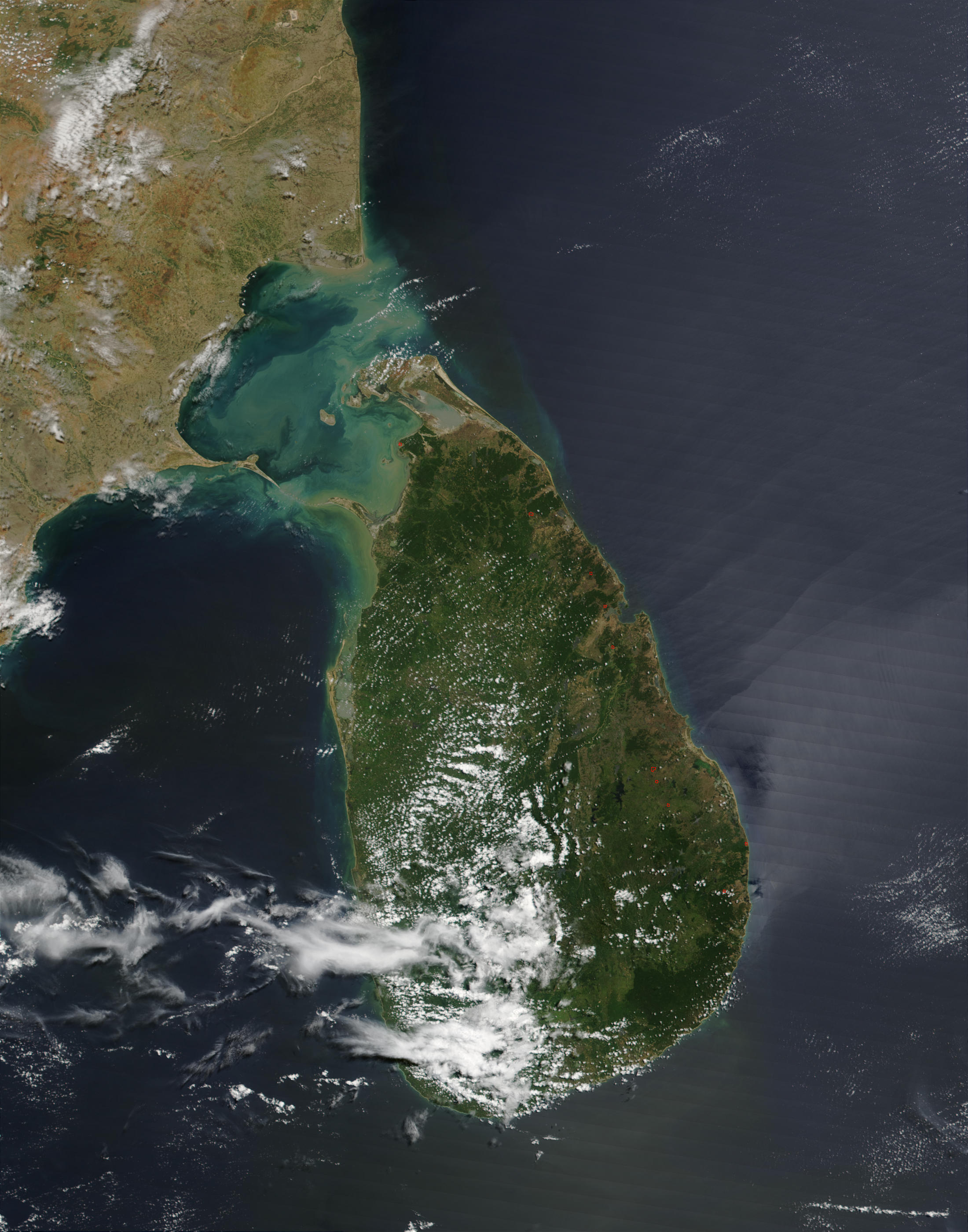
NASA satellite view of Sri Lanka revealing sparser areas of forest to the north and east of the island

Deforestation is one of the most serious environmental issues in Sri Lanka. Sri Lanka's current forest cover as of 2017 was 29.7%. In the 1920s, the island had a 49 percent forest cover but by 2005 this had fallen by approximately 26 percent. (29.40% in 2018) or 24-35%. Between 1990 and 2000, Sri Lanka lost an average of 26,800 ha of forests per year. This amounts to an average annual deforestation rate of 1.14%. Between 2000 and 2005 the rate accelerated to 1.43% per annum. However, with a long history of policy and laws towards environmental protection, deforestation rates of primary cover have decreased 35% since the end of the 1990s thanks to a strong history of conservation measures. The problem of deforestation in Sri Lanka is not as significant in the southern mountainous regions as it is in northern and lowland southern Sri Lanka, largely due to the nature of environmental protection.

=== Southeast Asia ===
Forest loss is acute in Southeast Asia, the second of the world's great biodiversity hot spots. According to a 2005 report conducted by the FAO, Vietnam has the second highest rate of deforestation of primary forests in the world, second to only Nigeria. More than 90% of the old-growth rainforests of the Philippine Archipelago have been cut. Other Southeast Asian countries where major deforestation is ongoing are Cambodia and Laos. According to a documentary by TelePool, deforestation is being directed by corrupt military personnel and the government (forestry services).

==== Cambodia ====
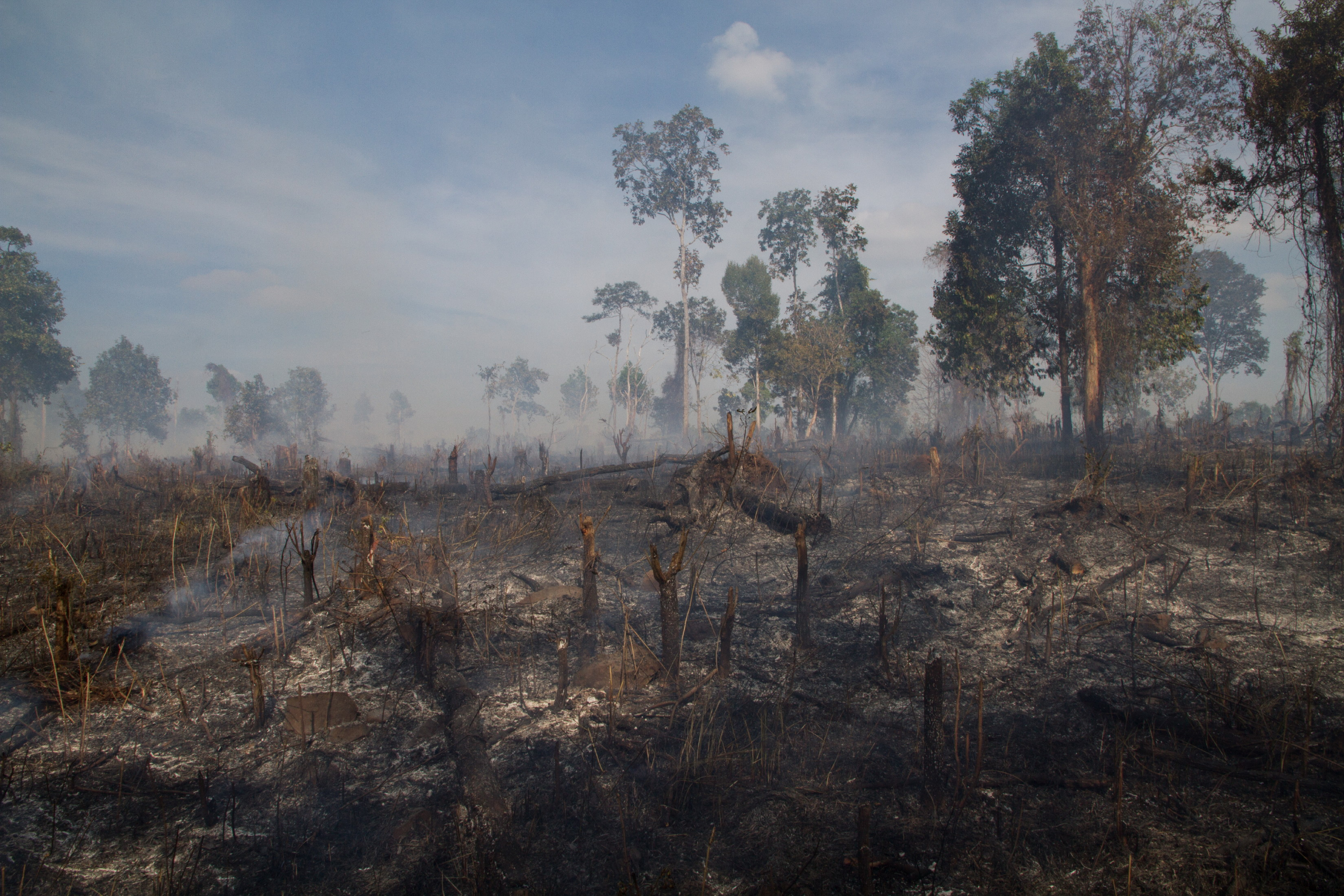
Illegal deforestation near Saen Monourom, Mondulkiri Province, Cambodia

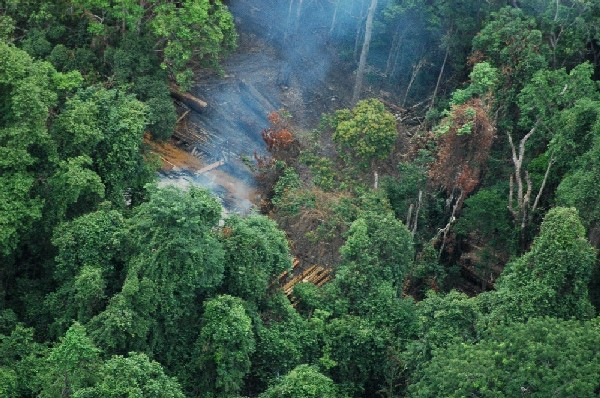
An illegal logging camp in the Cardamom Mountains in Koh Kong Province, Cambodia

Deforestation in Cambodia has increased in recent years. Cambodia is one of the world's most forest endowed countries, that was not historically widely deforested. However, massive deforestation for economic development threatens its forests and ecosystems. As of 2015, the country has one of the highest rates of deforestation in the world.

Deforestation has directly resulted from poorly managed commercial logging, fuel wood collection, agricultural invasion, and infrastructure and urban development. Indirect pressures include rapid population growth, inequalities in land tenure, lack of agriculture technology, and limited employment opportunities.

The Cambodian government has played a large role in shaping the use of the country's forests. An unusually large area of Cambodia has been designated as protected areas and biodiversity corridors, over 38% (more than 7 million hectares) of the total land mass, but many protections have subsequently been overruled by concessions sold to both national and foreign companies for agroindustrial plantations and mining developments, even in national parks.

The Cambodian government has been broadly criticized domestically and internationally for these contradicting policies, and a general lack of enforcement of environmental laws. They have faced pressures to practice a more sustainable forestry overall. The fate of Cambodia's forests will largely affect local communities that rely on the forests for their livelihood. Around 80% of its population lives in rural areas.

Cambodia's primary forest cover fell dramatically from over 70% in 1970 at the end of the Vietnam War to just 3.1% in 2007, when less than 3,220 square kilometers of primary forest remained. Deforestation is proceeding at an alarming rate: nearly 75% of forest loss has occurred since the end of 1990s. In total, Cambodia lost 25,000 square kilometers of forest between 1990 and 2005, 3,340 square kilometer of which was primary forest. As of 2016, 87,424 square kilometers of forest remained including 28, 612 square kilometers of evergreen forest, with the result that the future sustainability of Cambodia's forest reserves is under severe threat.

==== Indonesia ====
As of 2008, at present rates, rainforests in Indonesia would be logged out in 10 years, Papua New Guinea in 13 to 16 years.

Indonesia had lost over 72% of intact forests and 40% of all forests completely in 2005. Illegal logging took place in 37 out of 41 national parks. Illegal logging costs up to US$4 billion a year. The lowland forests of Sumatra and Borneo were at risk of being wiped out by 2022. According to Transparency International, numerous controversial court decisions in this area have raised concerns about the integrity of the judiciary.

==== Malaysia ====
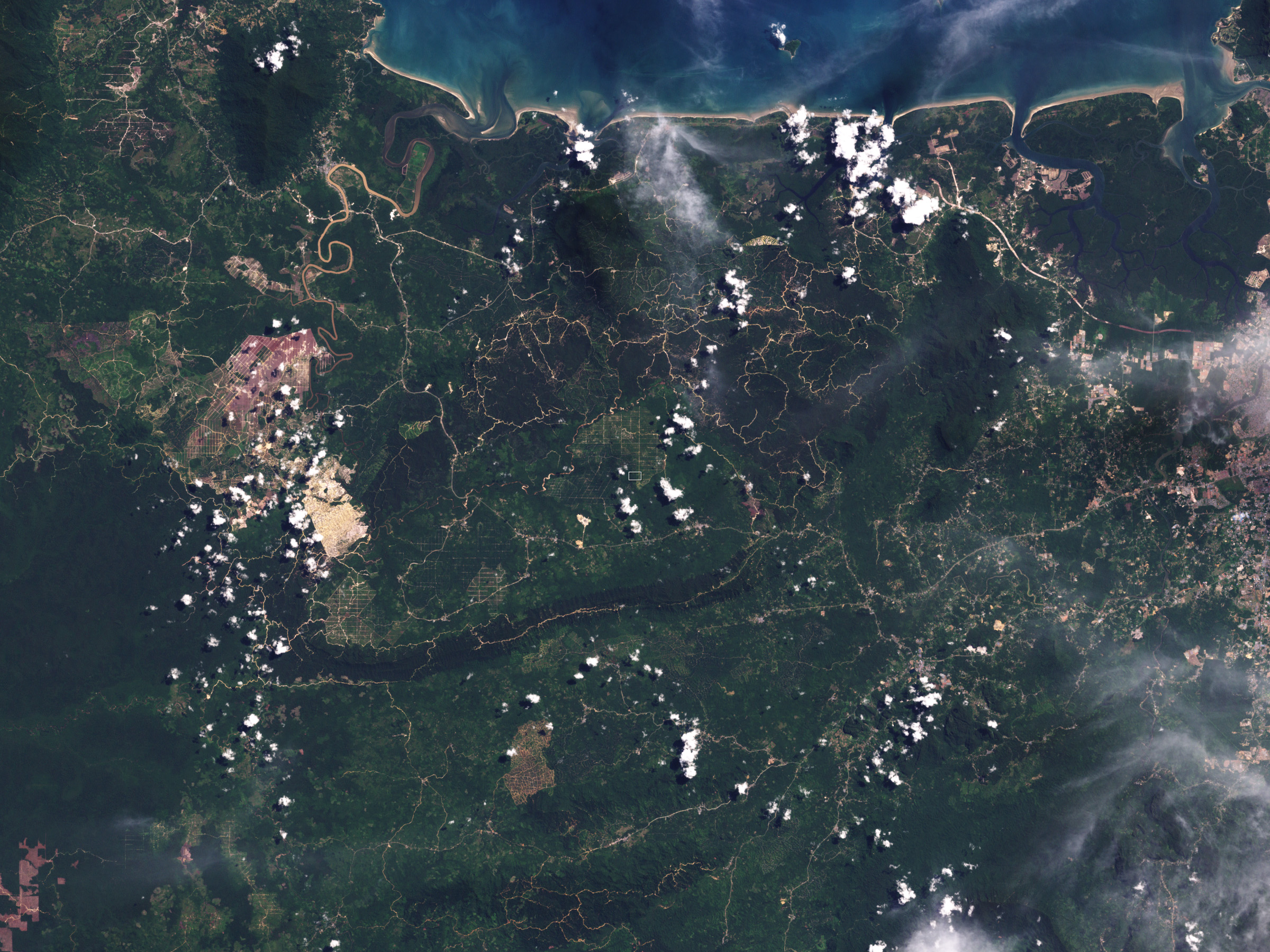
This image reveals the overall extent of land-cover change throughout the region.

Deforestation in Malaysia has taken place on an industrial scale. Malaysia is megadiverse country endowed with large tracts of tropical rainforest. In British Malaya, deforestation began in 1880 and was driven by the expansion of commercial rubber and palm oil cultivation. Between 1990 and 2010, Malaysia lost an estimated 8.6% of its forest cover, or around 1,920,000 hectares (4,700,000 acres). Logging and land clearing has particularly been driven by the palm oil sector. World Bank policies in the 1970s encouraged palm oil expansion and the IMF’s bailout package, following the 1998 economic crisis, incentivised the expansion of palm plantations. In recent decades, conservation efforts have attempted to protect Malaysia's forests and reduce the rate of deforestation.

==== Myanmar ====
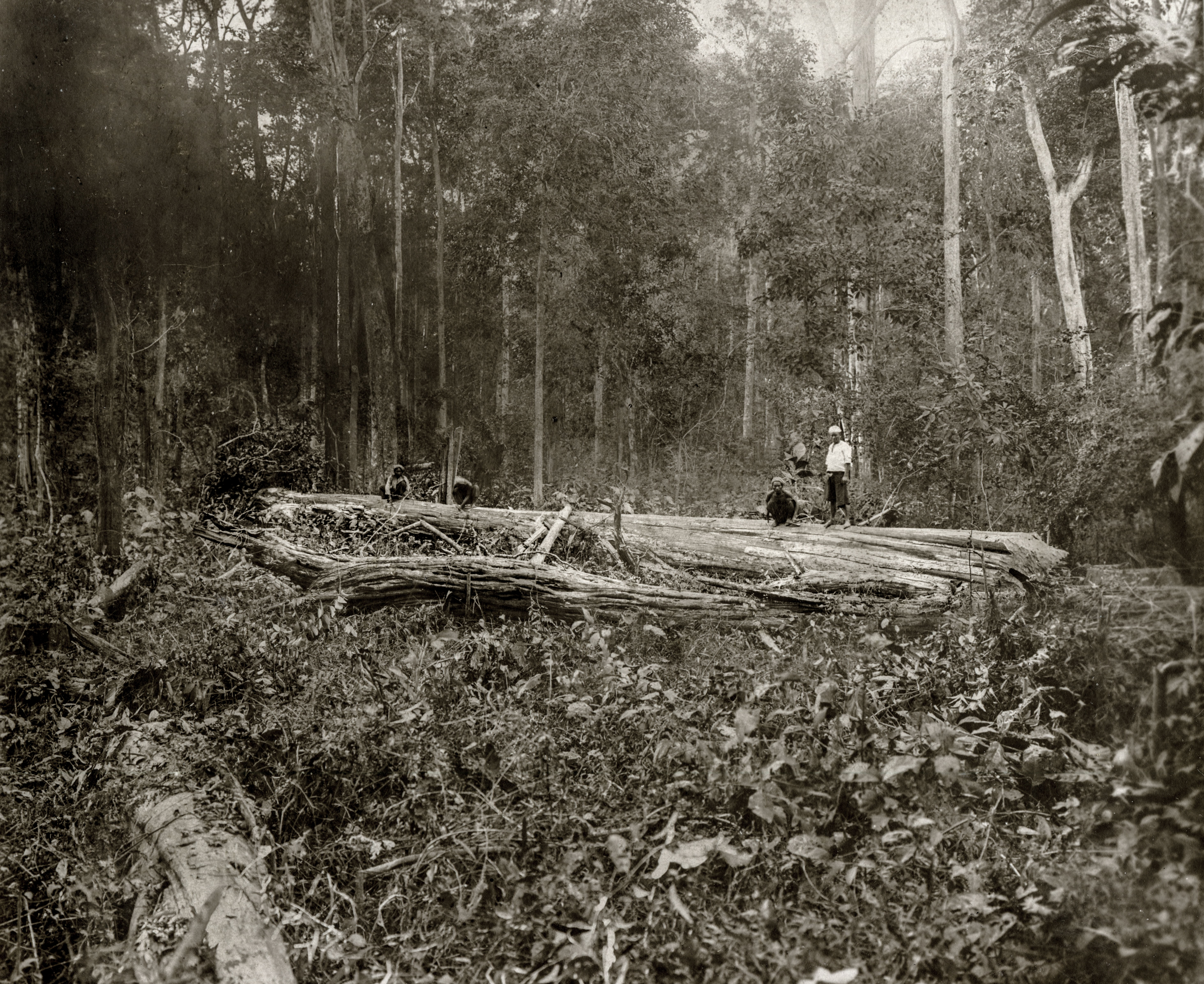
Black and white photograph of logging in Myanmar taken by a Bombay Burmah Trading Corporation official during British rule.

Deforestation in Myanmar (otherwise known as Burma) led to a reduction in forest cover from 70% of the country in 1948 to 48% by 2014. Myanmar possesses the largest expanse of tropical forest in mainland Southeast Asia, which contains high biodiversity. As of 2010, Myanmar's living forest biomass held 1,654 million metric tons of carbon and over 80 endemic species.

Under British rule, Myanmar's forests were logged for timber on an industrial scale for the first time. After independence, commercial logging greatly expanded under the military government of Ne Win. According to a report by the Food and Agriculture Organization, Myanmar lost 19%, or 7,445,000 hectares (28,750 sq mi), of its forest between 1990 and 2010. In the 21st century, contributing factors to deforestation in Myanmar include continued timber extraction, illegal logging, agricultural expansion, land disputes and civil conflict. Deforestation has increased amidst the escalation of civil war following the 2021 coup d'état.

==== Philippines ====
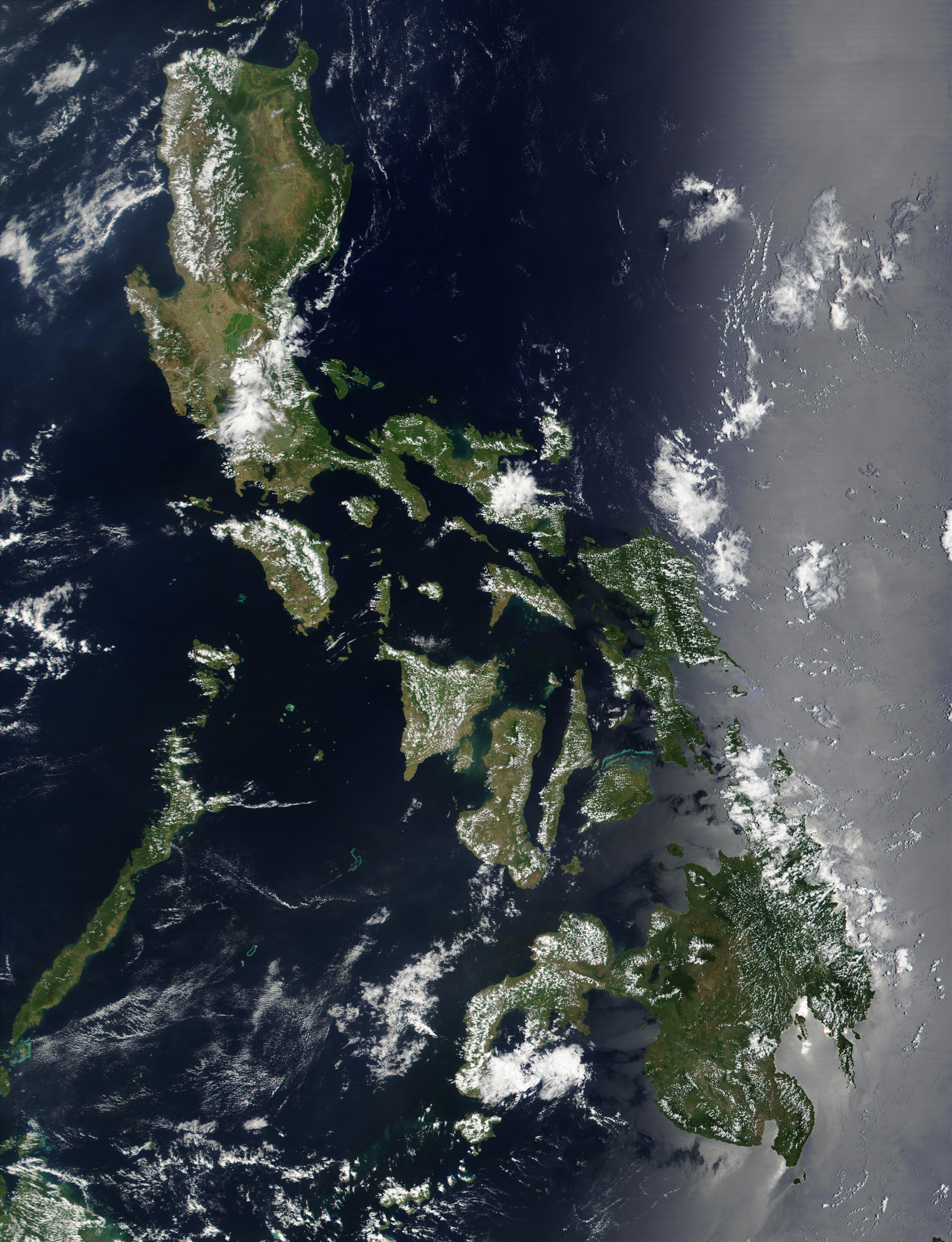
Satellite image of the Philippines in March 2002 showing forest cover in dark green

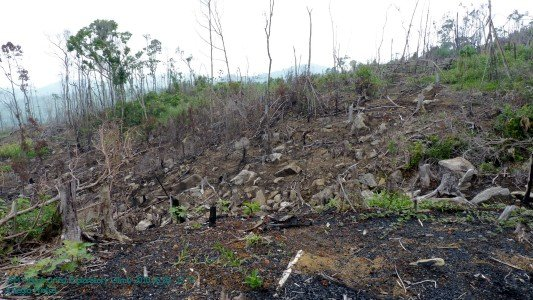
Small-scale logging and coal-making operations at the lower areas of the Sierra Madre mountain range

As in other Southeast Asian countries, deforestation in the Philippines is a major environmental issue. Over the course of the 20th century, the forest cover of the country dropped from 70 percent down to 20 percent. A 2010 land cover mapping by the National Mapping and Resource Information Authority revealed that the total forest cover of the Philippines is 6,839,718 hectares (68,397.18 km^{2}) or 23% of the country's total area of 30,000,000 hectares (300,000 km^{2}). Rapid population growth, unregulated logging concessions especially during Ferdinand Marcos' regime, illegal logging and mining, and destructive typhoons have been cited as major reasons for deforestation in the country.

Deforestation affects biodiversity in the Philippines and has long-term negative impacts on the country's food production. Deforestation in the country has also been associated with floods, soil erosion, deaths, and damage to property.

To combat deforestation, the Philippine government has made efforts to preserve and restore forests through reforestation projects such as the National Greening Program. Legislation to protect existing forests have also been proposed and enacted, while non-governmental organizations, Indigenous communities, and the private sector conduct tree-planting activities in various parts of the country.

==== Thailand ====
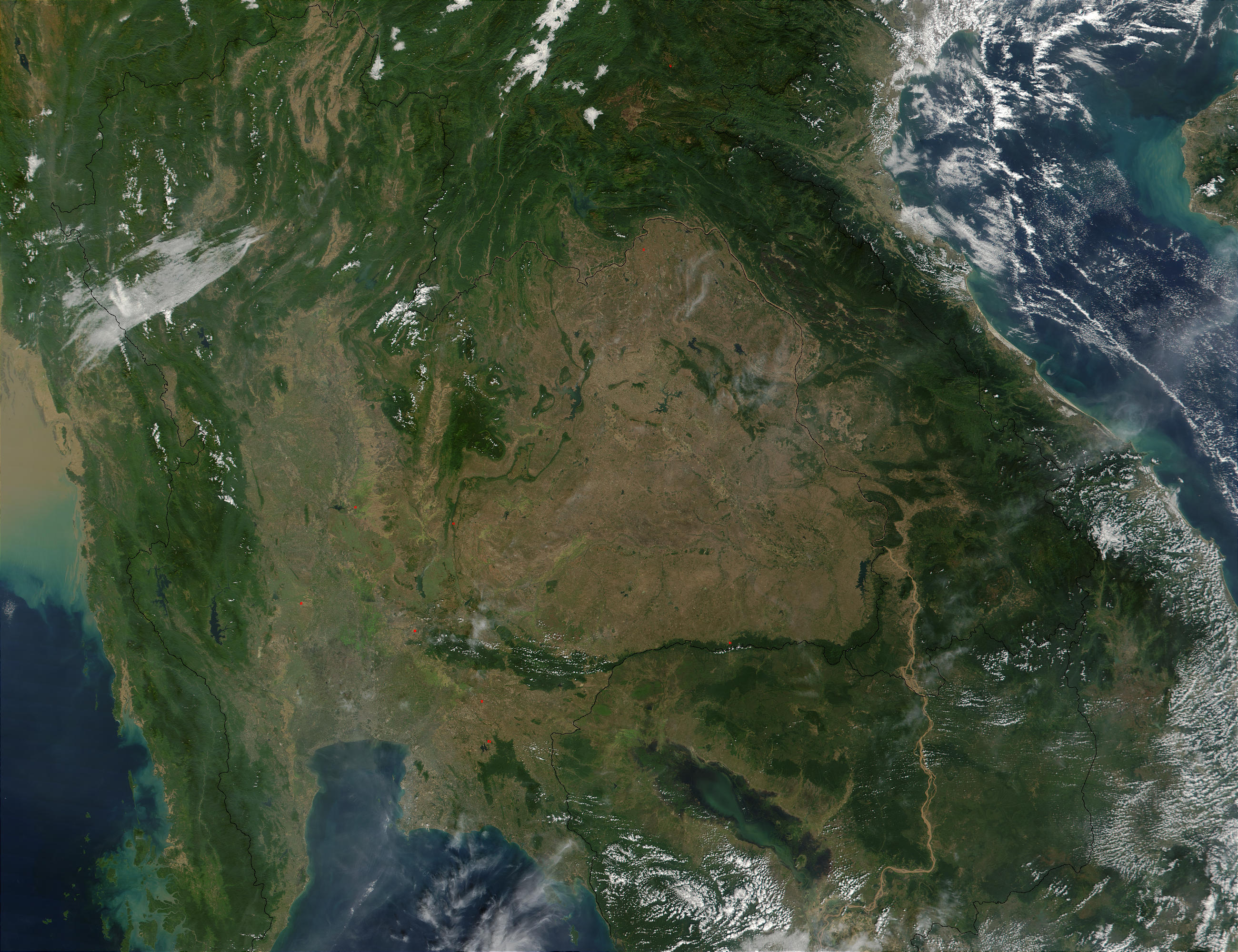
Thailand's borders with Laos and Cambodia are indicated by the brown expanse on the Thai side in this true-colour satellite image, which shows the effects of heavy deforestation.

Deforestation in Thailand refers to the conversion of its forested land to other uses. Deforestation numbers are inexact due to the scope of the issue. According to the Royal Forest Department (RFD) in 2019, Thai forests cover 31.6% (102 million rai) of Thailand's landmass. The department claims that forest coverage grew by 330,000 rai in 2018, an area equivalent in size to the island of Phuket. A year earlier, an academic claimed that, since 2016, forested area has declined by 18,000 rai, a significant improvement over the period 2008–2013, when a forested million rai were lost each year. In 1975, the government set a goal of 40% forest coverage—25% natural forest and 15% commercial forest—within 20 years. To achieve that target in 2018, 27 million rai would have to be afforested.

Between 1945 and 1975, forest cover in Thailand declined from 61% to 34% of the country's land area. Over the succeeding 11 years, Thailand lost close to 28% of all of its remaining forests. This means that the country lost 3.1% of its forest cover each year over that period. An estimate by the World Wildlife Fund concluded that between 1973 and 2009, 43% of forest loss in the Greater Mekong subregion occurred in Thailand and Vietnam.

The Thai Highlands in northern Thailand, the most heavily forested region of the country, were not subject to central government control and settlement until the second half of the 19th century when British timber firms, notably the Bombay Burmah Trading Corporation and the Borneo Company Limited, entered the teak trade in the late-1880s and early-1890s. The Royal Forest Department, created in 1896 and headed by a British forester until 1925, sought to conserve the forests against the worst business practices of British, Thai, and Chinese timber firms who worked in the region.

During the 20th century, deforestation in Thailand was driven primarily by agricultural expansion, although teak deforestation happened as a direct result of logging. The Royal Forest Department has been referred to as "Forest Death" by environmental activists and those living with a close relationship with the forest, as its general promotion of deforestation for logging and other agricultural ventures resulted in the large decline in forest cover. Much of the growth of cropland in the highlands of Thailand, where most of the deforestation has occurred, comes as a result of the growth and globalization of Thailand's agricultural economy and the relative scarcity of land available in the lowlands.

The Thai government, through both legislation and action of the Royal Forest Department, is beginning to emphasize forest restoration through a combination of policies seeking the reservation of existing forest land for conservation and the promotion of tree plantations to contribute to the amount of forest cover. Notably, the country's policies seeking to emphasize conservation and amelioration of upland forests have come into significant conflict with upland communities, whose traditional means of agricultural practice and habitation have been significantly impacted. In addition, a contingent of Buddhist monks in the country, known as "ecology monks", have become increasingly engaged in activities promoting environmental conservation and protection of original forest land.

==== Vietnam ====
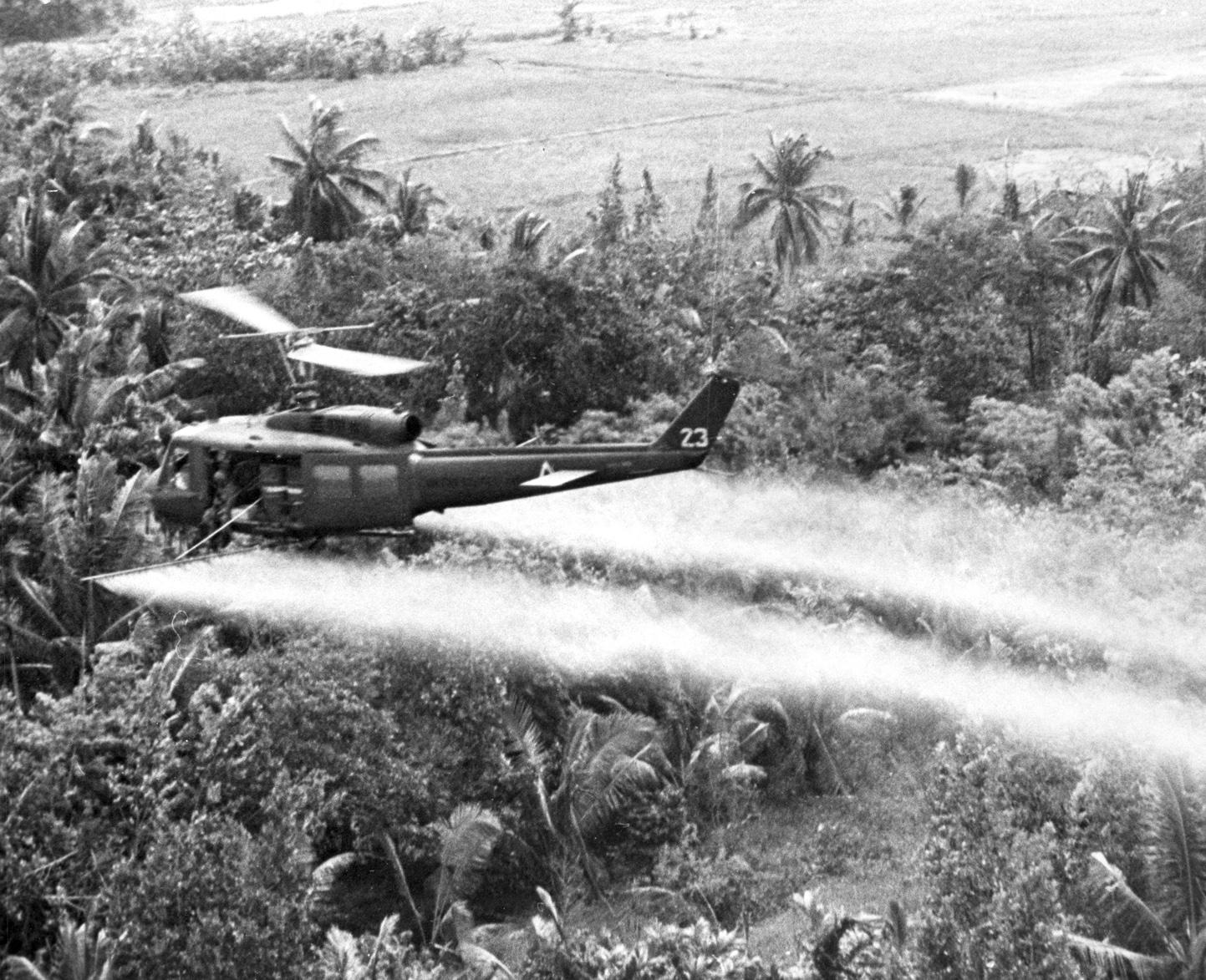
The use of Agent Orange caused significant deforestation during the Vietnam War.

According to a 2005 report conducted by the Food and Agriculture Organization of the United Nations (FAO), Vietnam has the second highest rate of deforestation of primary forests in the world, second only to Nigeria. The use of defoliants during the Vietnam War had a devastating and long-lasting impact on the country's forests and ecology, affecting 14-44% of total forest cover, with coastal mangrove forests being most affected.

The use of herbicides like Agent Orange during the war not only defoliated vast tracts of forest but also left behind long-term environmental damage, including soil contamination and disruptions to the natural regeneration of ecosystems. These effects are still felt today, particularly in areas where recovery has been slow or hindered by ongoing deforestation pressures. The war left a legacy of environmental degradation that affected not only the forests but also the communities that relied on them for resources such as food, timber, and fuel. Many communities, particularly in the central and southern regions, were displaced or forced into subsistence farming, further contributing to the degradation of the landscape. And which in present day continue to face environmental challenges.

== Europe ==
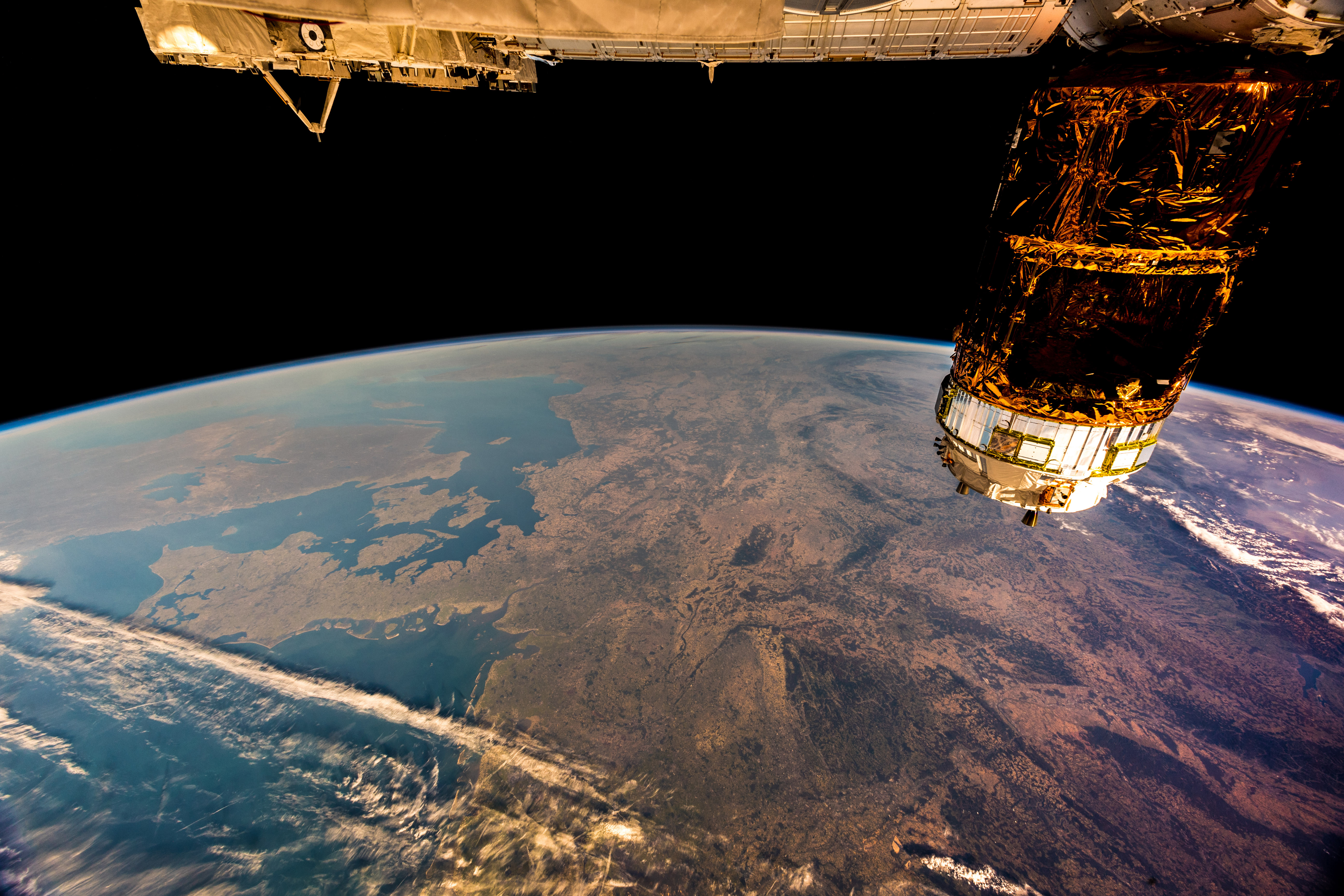
Deforestation in Europe, 2020

Europe has lost more than half of its forests in the past 6,000 years. This has primarily been due to agricultural expansion and demand for wood fuel. According to satellite data, the loss of biomass in EU's forests increased by 69% in the period from 2016 to 2018, compared with the period from 2011 to 2015.

=== Finland ===
Deforestation accounts for 6% of Finland's total climate-warming emissions. Forests that are cut down for buildings, roads, and new fields total 19,000 hectares annually. The Rinne Cabinet of Prime Minister Antti Rinne aimed to tax building in forests, but no such tax was in place in August 2019.

Finnish forest management practices have resulted in significant net releases of carbon into the atmosphere from Finnish forest and mire ecosystems.

=== Iceland ===
Prior to the deforestation of Iceland in the Middle Ages, some 40% of the land was forested. Today, the country is about 2% forested, with the Icelandic Forest Service aiming to increase that share to 10% through reforestation and natural regrowth.

Iceland has undergone extensive deforestation since Scandinavians settled in the ninth century. At the time of human settlement about 1,150 years ago, birch forest and woodland covered 'at least 25%' of Iceland's land area. The settlers began by cutting down the forests and burning shrubland to create fields and grazing land. Deforestation did not end in Iceland until the middle of the 20th century. Afforestation and revegetation have restored small areas of land. However, agriculture was the main reason birch forests and woodland did not grow back.

=== Ireland ===
Ireland was historically a temperate rainforest with 80% of the island under tree cover. Deforestation by humans began taking place already in the Bronze Age but reached its peak under British colonial rule, particularly the 16th and 17th century Plantations, that saw mass scale deforestation to create agricultural lands, and to supplement the need for timber for shipbuilding for Britain's early phase of empire building. Tree cover reached its lowest point of 1.5% at the beginning of the twentieth century, prior to Irish independence, due to more industrialised sawmills used in late nineteenth century. The Irish state promoted reforestation during the 20th century, reversing the trend (albeit primarily via plantations of non-native conifers intended for felling), with an increase to 12% tree cover today, which still however remains one of the lowest percentages in Europe, where the average is 39%.

=== Italy ===
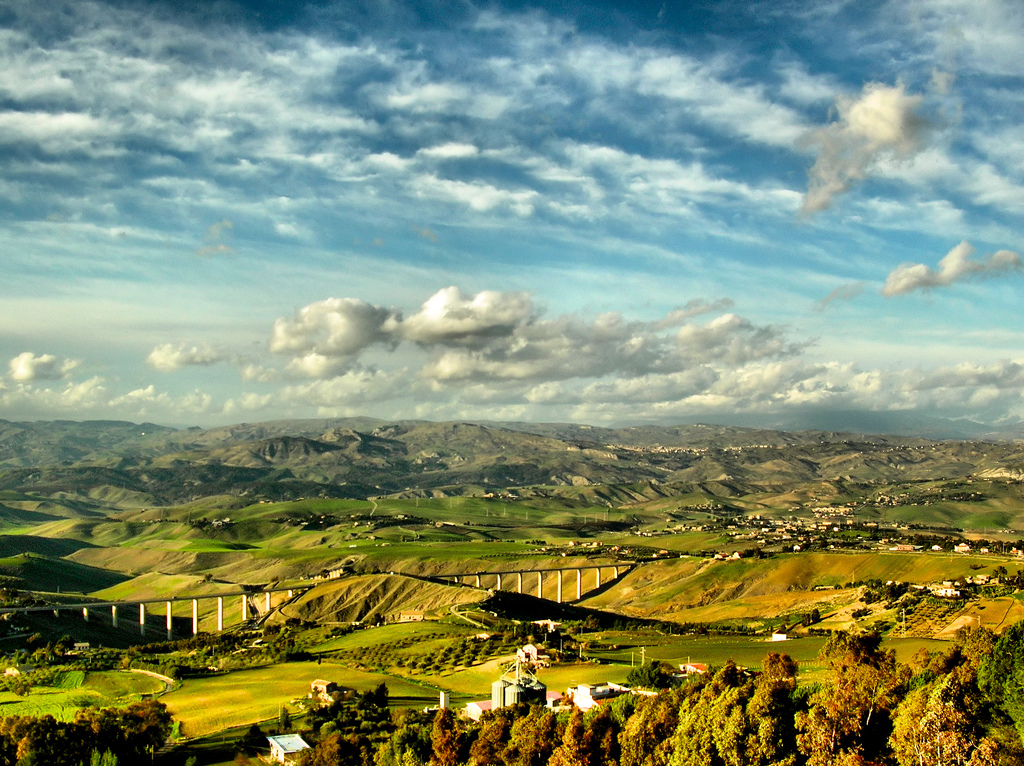
Countryside of central Sicily

Sicily is an oft-cited example of man-made deforestation, practiced since Roman times when the island was made into an agricultural region, and continued to this day. Deforestation gradually modified the climate, leading to a decline in rainfall and the drying of rivers. Today, the entire central and southwest provinces are practically without any forests. This has also affected Sicily's wild fauna, of which little is left in the island's pastures and crop fields.

=== Netherlands ===
Map of national parks in the Netherlands.

The Netherlands, once home to forests and marshes, has also experienced deforestation. The remaining forests and marshes are strictly regulated by staatsbosbeheer (or in English: state forest management) and crisscrossed by service roads and cycling paths. But they are also protected by the Dutch government with the government taking action with many national parks and protected regions.

=== United Kingdom ===
Nearly all forests in the UK have been turned into pasture over the centuries. As of 2021, 13.2% (3.2 million ha) of the UK is woodland which is an increase from 12% in 1998. However, much of the increased cover is non-native trees. A bucolic, rolling landscape has replaced the idea of true forests in the minds of most Britons.

== North America ==
=== Caribbean ===
==== Haiti ====
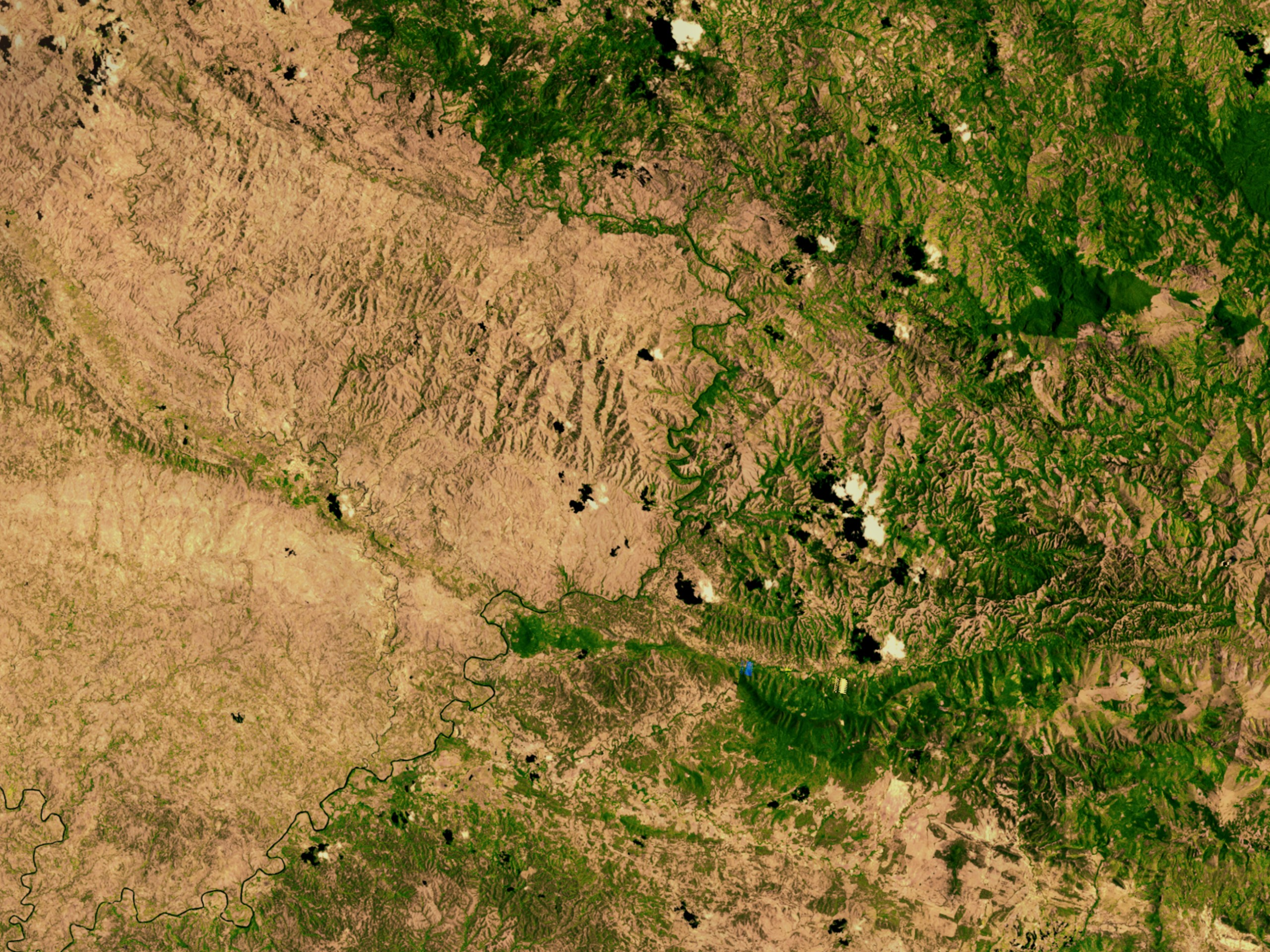
A satellite image of the border between the denuded landscape of Haiti (left) and the Dominican Republic (right)

Deforestation is a complex and intertwined environmental and social problem in Haiti. The most-recent national research on charcoal estimates that approximately 946,500 metric tons of charcoal are produced and consumed annually in Haiti, making it the second-largest agricultural value chain in the country and representing approximately 5% of GDP.

=== Central America ===
The history of most Central American countries involves cycles of deforestation and reforestation. By the 15th century, intensive Mayan agriculture had significantly thinned the forests. Before Europeans arrived, forests covered 500,000 square km– approximately 90% of the region. Eventually, the forcing of "Europe's money economy on Latin America" created the demand for the exportation of primary products, which introduced the need for large amounts of cleared agricultural land to produce those products. Since the 1960s, cattle ranching has become the primary reason for land clearing. The lean grass-fed cattle produced by Central American ranches (as opposed to grain-fed cattle raised elsewhere) was perfectly suited for American fast-food restaurants and this seemingly bottomless market has created the so-called "hamburger connection" which links "consumer lifestyles in North America with deforestation in Central America".

=== Northern America ===
==== Canada ====
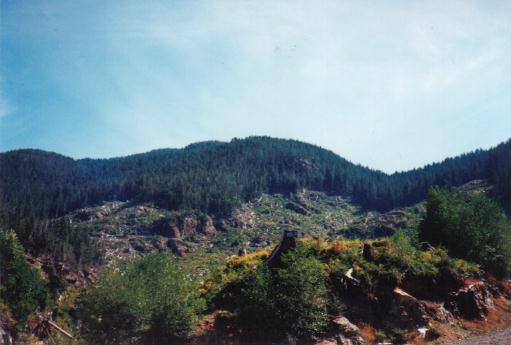
Though replanted in 1987, this forest near Clayoquot Sound, British Columbia lost much topsoil and resembled a desert by 1993

In 2005, an estimated 56,000 hectares were deforested in Canada. Deforestation affected less than 0.02% of Canada's forests in 2005. The agricultural sector accounted for just over half of the deforestation in 2005, the result of forests having been cleared for pasture or crops. The remainder was caused by urban development, transportation corridors, and recreation (19%); hydroelectric development (10%); the forest sector (10%); and other natural resource extraction industries (8%). About two thirds of this deforestation occurred in Canada's boreal forest, mainly in Alberta, Saskatchewan, and Manitoba where the forest borders the Prairies.

In Canada, prior to 2000, less than 8% of the boreal forest was protected from development and more than 50% has been allocated to logging companies for cutting.

===== British Columbia =====
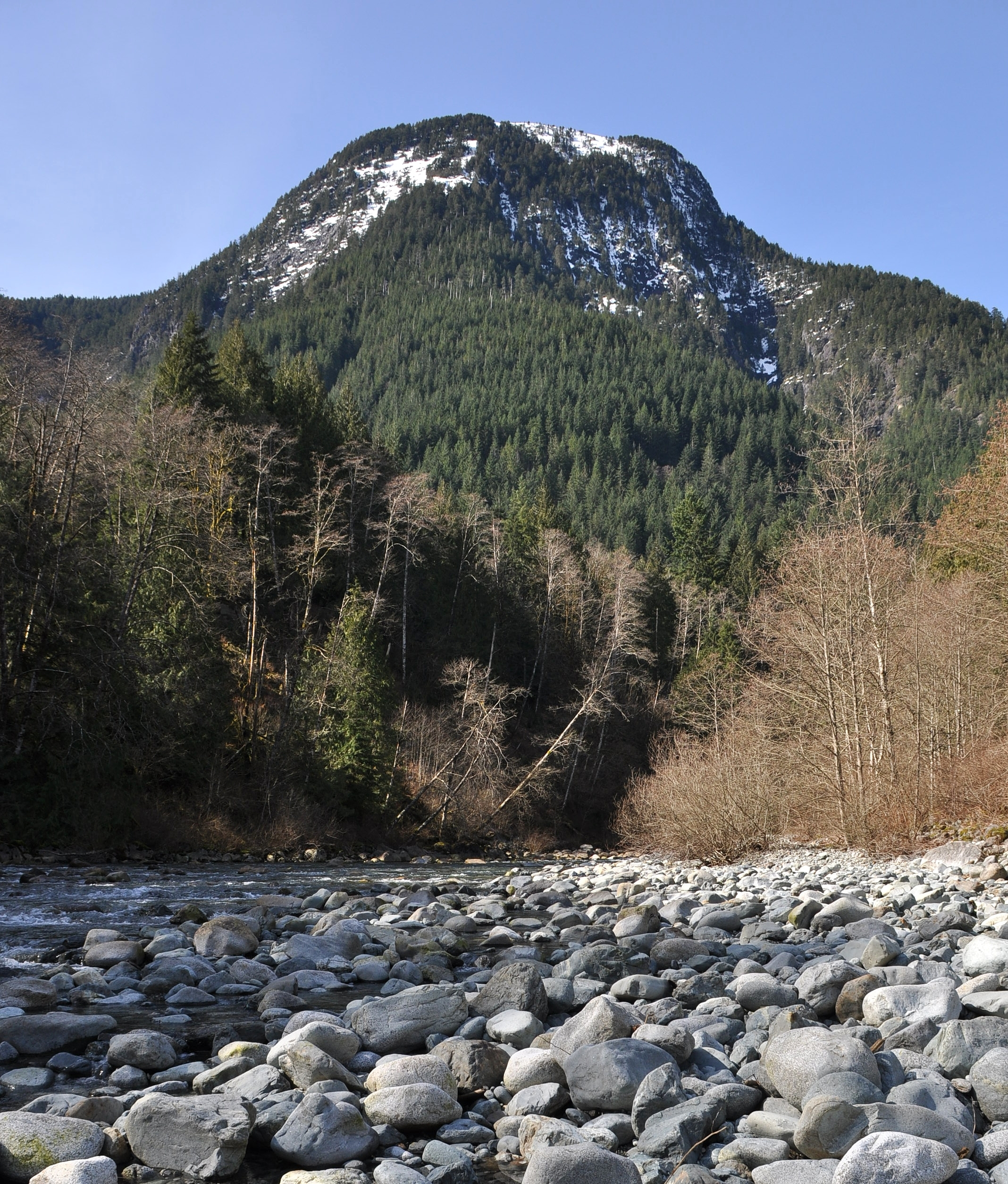
Evan's Peak, British Columbia

Deforestation in British Columbia has resulted in a net loss of 1.06 million hectares (2.6 million acres) of tree cover between the years 2000 and 2020. More traditional losses have been exacerbated by increased threats from climate change driven fires, increased human activity, and invasive species. The introduction of sustainable forestry efforts such as the Zero Net Deforestation Act seeks to reduce the rate of forest cover loss. In British Columbia, forests cover over 55 million hectares, which is 57.9% of British Columbia's 95 million hectares of land. The forests are mainly composed (over 80%) of coniferous trees, such as pines, spruces and firs.

==== United States ====
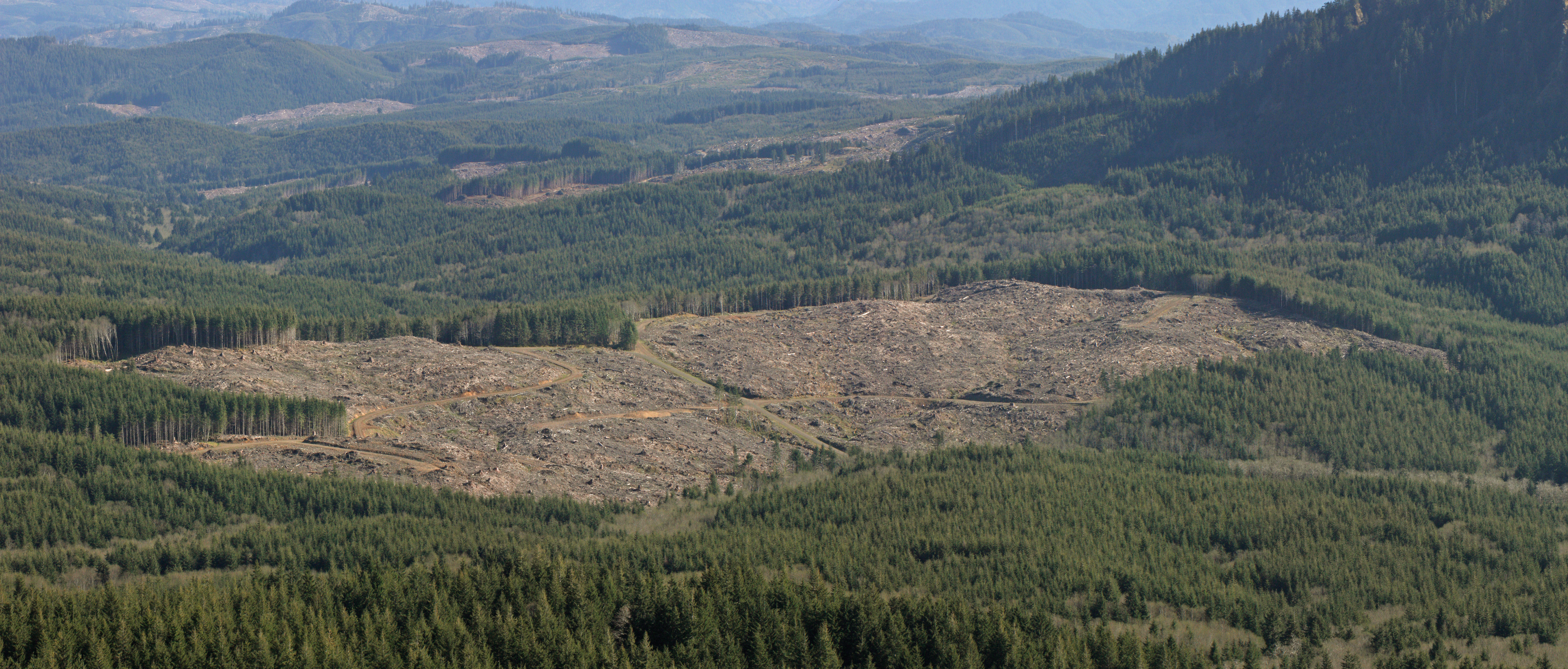
Clearcutting in Clatsop County, Oregon

In 1600, prior to the arrival of European-Americans, roughly half of the land area of the present-day United States was forest – about 4,000,000 square kilometres (990,000,000 acres). For the next 300 years land was cleared, mostly for agriculture, at a rate that matched the rate of population growth. For every person added to the population, one to two hectares of land was cultivated. This trend continued until the 1920s when the amount of crop land stabilized in spite of continued population growth. As abandoned farmland reverted to forest, the amount of forestland increased from 1952, reaching a peak in 1963 of 3,080,000 km^{2} (760,000,000 acres). Since 1963 there has been a steady decrease of forest area with the exception of some gains from 1997.

== Oceania ==
=== Australia ===
Due to relatively recent colonisation, Australia has had high rates of deforestation, primarily due to clearing for agricultural purposes. Since colonisation approximately 50% of rainforests have been cleared and overall forest cover has reduced by over a third. In 2007, rates were expected to decrease with the implementation of new legislation.

In 1998, deforestation was thought to be responsible for around 12% of Australia's total carbon emissions. Between 2000 and 2015 emissions from land clearing decreased by 64%.

An additional factor currently causing the loss of forest cover is the expansion of urban areas. Littoral rainforest growing along coastal areas of eastern Australia is now rare due to ribbon development to accommodate the demand for seachange lifestyles.

=== New Zealand ===
In the 800 years of human occupation of New Zealand, 75% of the forests have been lost. Initially, it was by wholesale burning by the British. Remaining forests were logged for lumber for the burgeoning population. By 2000, all logging of native trees on public land was stopped. Logging on private land is controlled with a permit system and with the Resource Management Act.

=== Papua New Guinea ===
Papua New Guinea has one of the world's largest rainforests. Illegal logging was among highest in the world in 2007, estimated as ca 70–90% of all timber export.

== South America ==
=== Amazon Rainforest ===
Overall, 20% of the Amazon rainforest has been "transformed" (deforested) and another 6% has been "highly degraded", causing Amazon Watch to warn that the Amazonia is in the midst of a tipping point crisis.

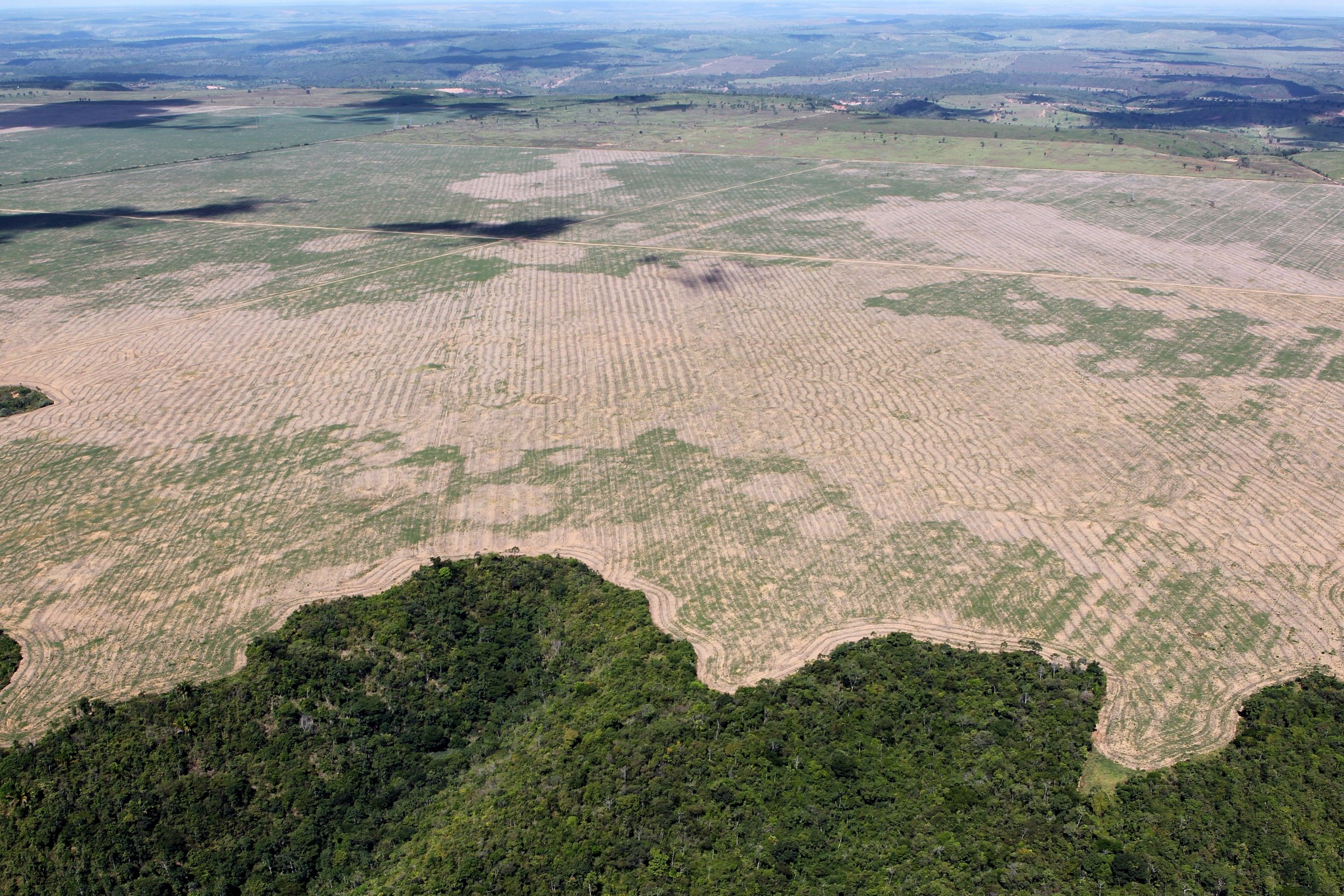
Deforestation in the Maranhão state of Brazil, July 2016

The Amazon rainforest, spanning an area of 3,000,000 km^{2} (1,200,000 sq mi), is the world's largest rainforest. It encompasses the largest and most biodiverse tropical rainforest on the planet, representing over half of all rainforests. The Amazon region includes the territories of nine nations, with Brazil containing the majority (60%), followed by Peru (13%), Colombia (10%), and smaller portions in Venezuela, Ecuador, Bolivia (6%), Guyana, Suriname, and French Guiana. Over one-third of the Amazon rainforest is designated as formally acknowledged indigenous territory, amounting to more than 3,344 territories. Historically, indigenous Amazonian peoples have relied on the forest for various needs such as food, shelter, water, fiber, fuel, and medicines. The forest holds significant cultural and cosmological importance for them. But more recently, the Amazon rainforest has been being cut down due to cattle farming and soybean farming. Soybean production is a major driver of deforestation in the Amazon, with cultivation increasing by over 300% in certain periods. Although often grown on previously cleared cattle land, expanding "soy frontiers" directly destroy forests. The 2006 Soy Moratorium, which banned buying soy from newly deforested areas, is currently weakening.

Despite external pressures, deforestation rates are comparatively lower in indigenous territories due to legal land titling initiatives that have reduced deforestation by 75% in Peru. By the year 2022, around 26% of the forest was considered as deforested or highly degraded. According to the Council on Foreign Relations, 300,000 square miles have been lost. According to the Food and Agriculture Organization, approximately 10 million hectares of global forests are lost every year. Between 2010-2020, the net loss in forests globally was 4.7 million hectares per year.

Cattle ranching in the Brazilian Amazon has been identified as the primary cause of deforestation, accounting for about 80% of all deforestation in the region. This makes it the world's largest single driver of deforestation, contributing to approximately 14% of the global annual deforestation. Government tax revenue has subsidized much of the agricultural activity leading to deforestation. By 1995, 70% of previously forested land in the Amazon and 91% of land deforested since 1970 had been converted for cattle ranching. The remaining deforestation primarily results from mechanized cropland producing crops such as soy and palm and poor small-scale subsistence farmers who are encouraged to settle down in Amazonian forests by government land policies. In 2011, soy bean farming was estimated to account for around 15% of deforestation in the Amazon.

Satellite data from 2018 revealed a decade-high rate of deforestation in the Amazon, with approximately 7,900 km^{2} (3,100 sq mi) destroyed between August 2017 and July 2018. The states of Mato Grosso and Pará experienced the highest levels of deforestation during this period. Illegal logging was cited as a cause by the Brazilian environment minister, while critics highlighted the expansion of agriculture as a factor encroaching on the rainforest. Researchers warn that the forest may reach a tipping point where it cannot generate sufficient rainfall to sustain itself.

In May 2025, research from the University of Maryland’s Global Land Analysis and Discovery (GLAD) Lab, published via the World Resources Institute’s Global Forest Watch platform, found that global forest loss surged to record highs in 2024. Loss of tropical primary forests reached 6.7 million hectares—nearly twice the area lost in 2023 and roughly equivalent to the size of Panama. Brazil accounted for 42% of total tropical primary forest loss, largely driven by fires exacerbated by the country’s worst drought on record. Fires caused 66% of Brazil’s forest loss in 2024, a more than sixfold increase from 2023. The Amazon experienced its highest tree cover loss since 2016.

=== Brazil ===
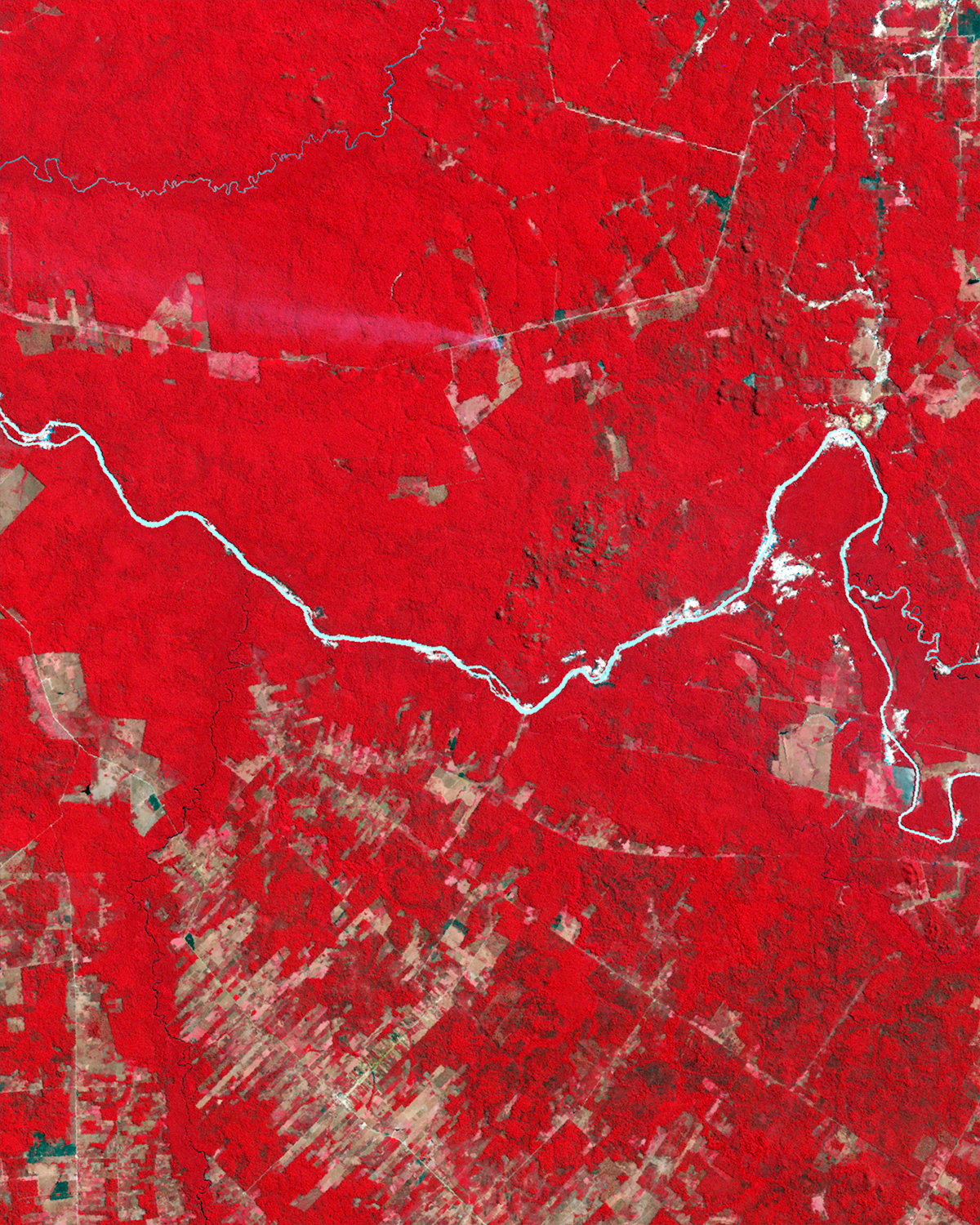
Mato Grosso, Brazil 1992

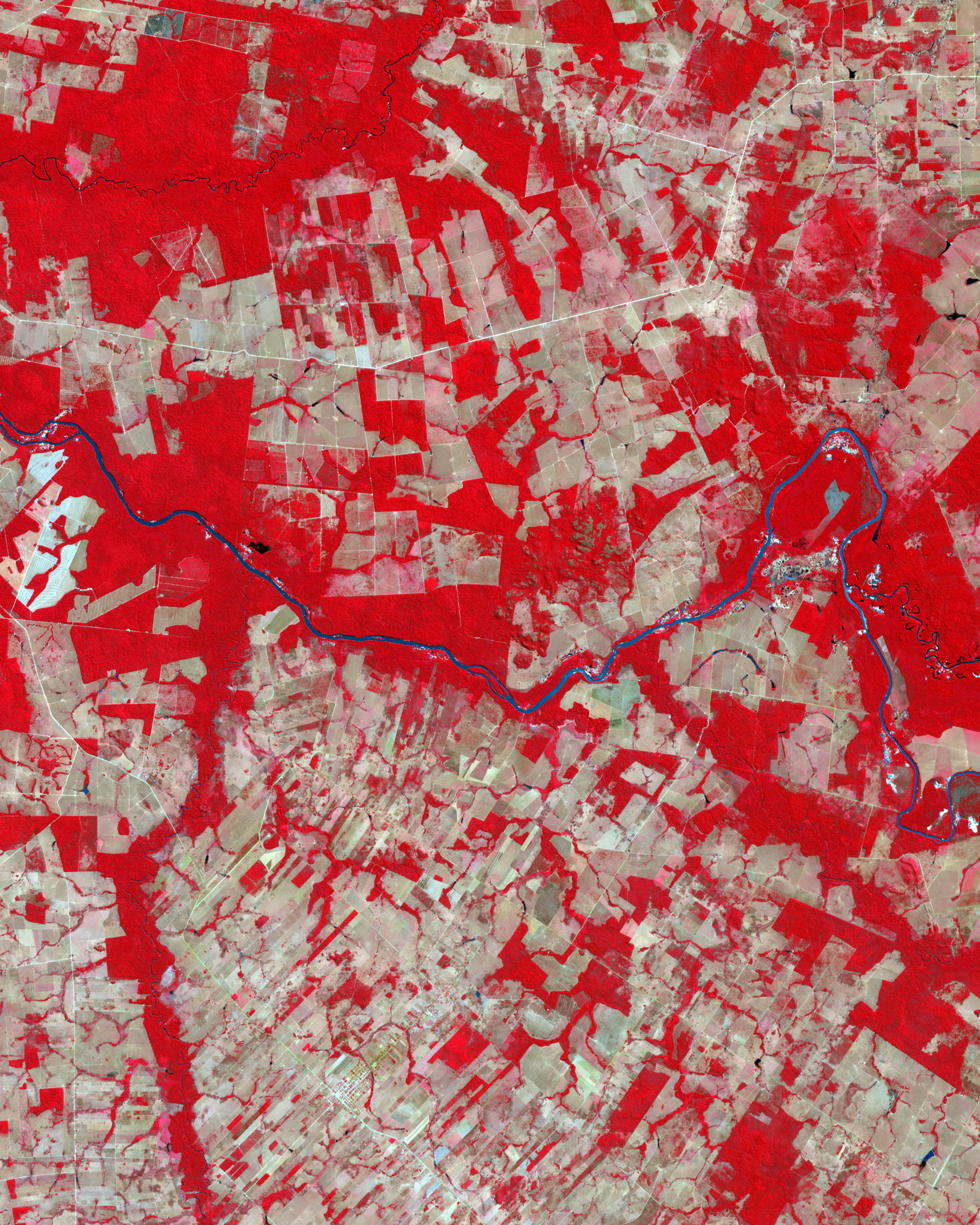
Deforestation in Mato Grosso, Brazil through 2006

The deforestation rate in Brazil surged by 72% during Jair Bolsonaro's time in office, sharply reversing a conservation trend from the early 2010s.

There is no agreement on what drives deforestation in Brazil, though a broad consensus exists that expansion of croplands and pastures is important. Increases in commodity prices may increase the rate of deforestation. Recent development of a new variety of soybean has led to the displacement of beef ranches and farms of other crops, which, in turn, move farther into the forest. Certain areas such as the Atlantic Rainforest have been diminished to just 7% of their original size. Although much conservation work has been done, few national parks or reserves are efficiently enforced. Some 80% of logging in the Amazon is illegal.

In 2008, Brazil's government announced a record rate of deforestation in the Amazon. Deforestation jumped by 69% in 2008 compared to 2007's twelve months, according to official government data. Deforestation could wipe out or severely damage nearly 60% of the Amazon rainforest by 2030, according to a 2007 report from WWF.

=== Bolivia ===
Bolivia has the 13th largest national share of the world's forest cover. As of 2015, its primary forest cover was 36.2 million hectares, the 13th largest national area in the world and representing 2.8% of the worldwide total. Bolivia also has the seventh largest amount of tropical rainforest. Overall, forests made up 51.4 million hectares or 46.8% of the country's total area as of 2013. Both primary forest and overall forest cover have been declining in recent decades.

Due to mostly cattle ranching, mechanized cultivation and small-scale agriculture, Bolivia lost approximately 200,000 hectares of rainforest per year between 2006 and 2010. Demand for Bolivian agricultural products has risen in part due to the integration of Bolivian agriculture into international commodity markets. Brazilian companies and farmers in particular have made large investments giving them increasing control and influence over Bolivian land, which has resulted in deforestation. The Tierras Bajas region in eastern Bolivia, which was a site of a World Bank Development project, has seen some of the greatest deforestation due to the establishment of industrial scale soybean plantations largely by foreign landowners.

Colonization schemes have also contributed to deforestation in Bolivia. Since the 1960's, the Bolivian lowlands have seen large scale colonization by rural nationals from the Andean region as well as America and Japan. This has largely been encouraged by the Bolivian government. Inexpensive land and fertile soil were additional driving factors for these immigrants who contributed to organizing commercial farming causing deforestation to increase by 60% from the 1980's to the 1990's.

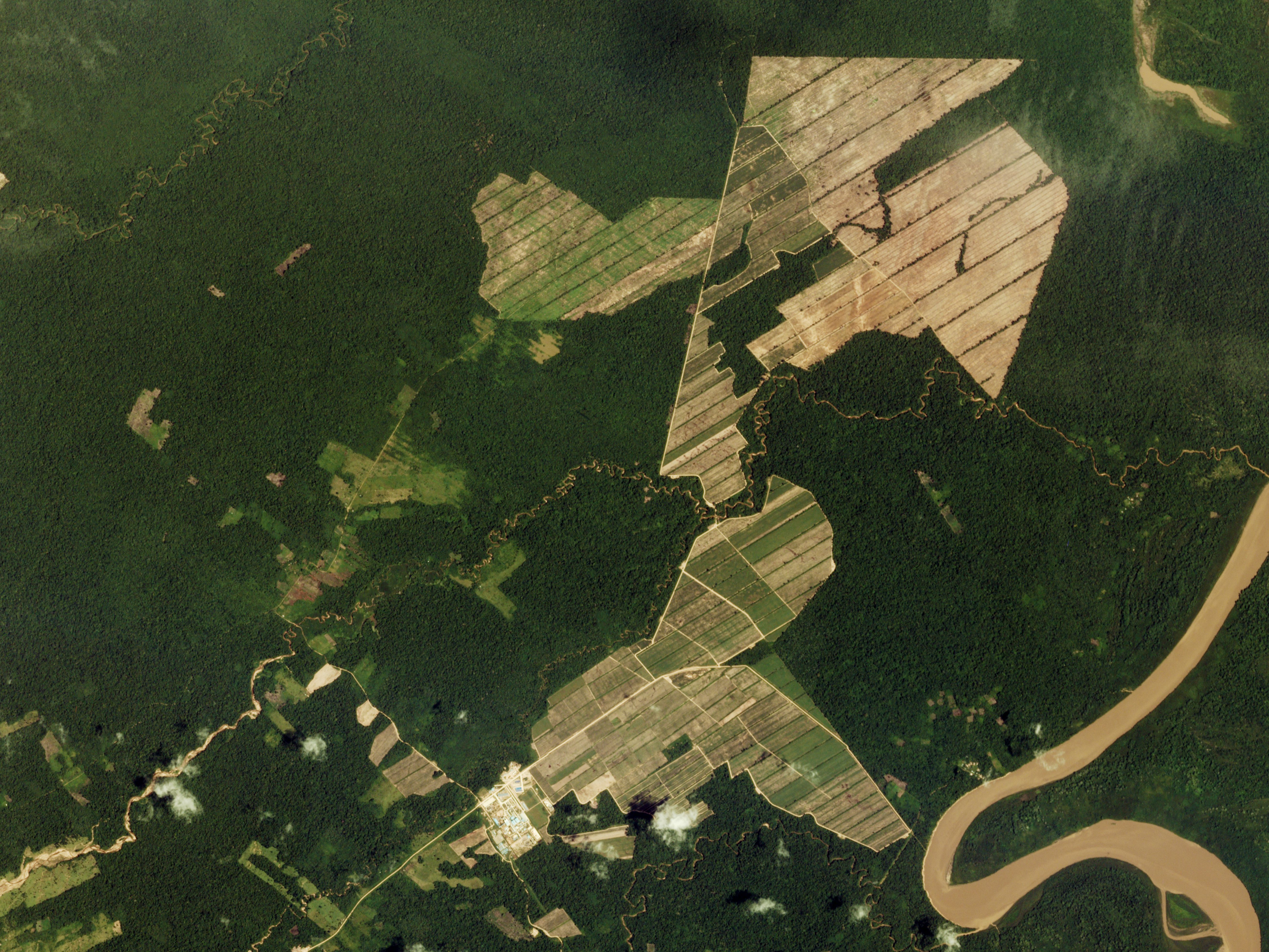
Deforestation in the Bolivian Andes

In recent years, the growth of coca-leaves has become widespread in Bolivia. To create space for these large plantations, large areas have been deforested via slash and burn operations. An estimated 4 hectares of forest need to be cleared for each one hectare of land needed for the cultivation of coca.

Logging, which is often done illegally in Bolivia, and forest fires are additional causes of deforestation. Illegal logging has occurred even in the Isiboro Secure National Park and Indigenous Territory (TIPNIS) which is a designated state park. Concerns about the impact of illegal logging on deforestation were so serious that in 2011 Bolivian protestors were able to halt the construction of a highway that would have increased access to the TIPNIS territory. Bolivia's highway network remains underdeveloped, restricting access to specific forested areas. However, as the country progresses, expanded road construction might not only lead to deforestation but also enhance access for illegal loggers to these forested regions.

Forest Cover in Bolivia (1,000s of hectares of primary forest)
1990	2000	2005	2010	2015	
40,804	39,046	38,164	37,164	36,164	2.8%
As reported to the Global Forest Resources Assessment.

The final figure (2.8%) represents the percentage of worldwide total in 2015.

Forest cover in Bolivia by type of forest (2013)
	Forest Type	Area (ha)	Percent of forest	Percent of Bolivia
1	Amazon forest	19,402,388	37.7	17.7
2	Chaco forest	9,098,162	17.7	8.3
3	Chiquitano forest	8,645,849	16.8	7.9
4	Yungas forest	6,565,994	12.8	6.0
5	Tucumano forest	3,322,885	6.5	3.0
6	Flooded forest	3,047,598	5.9	2.8
7	Pantanal forest	1,147,401	2.2	1.0
8	Dry inter-Andean forest	172,227	0.3	0.2
9	Andean forest	4,496	0.01	0.0
Total forest, 2013		51,407,000	100	46.8

Source: MMAyA-OTCA, summarized by Andersen et al 2016:S1.

=== Chile ===
Despite modern views of Atacama Desert as fully devoid of vegetation in pre-Hispanic and Colonial times a large flatland area known as Pampa del Tamarugal was forested, with demand of firewood associated silver and saltpeter mining causing widespread deforestation. While Tarapacá was still part of Peru demand of firewood by salpeter processing using the paradas method led to widespread deforestation around La Tirana and Canchones plus some areas to the south of these localities. Reforestation efforts in Pampa del Tamarugal begun in 1963 and since 1987 reforestated areas are protected in the Pampa del Tamarugal National Reserve.

=== Colombia ===
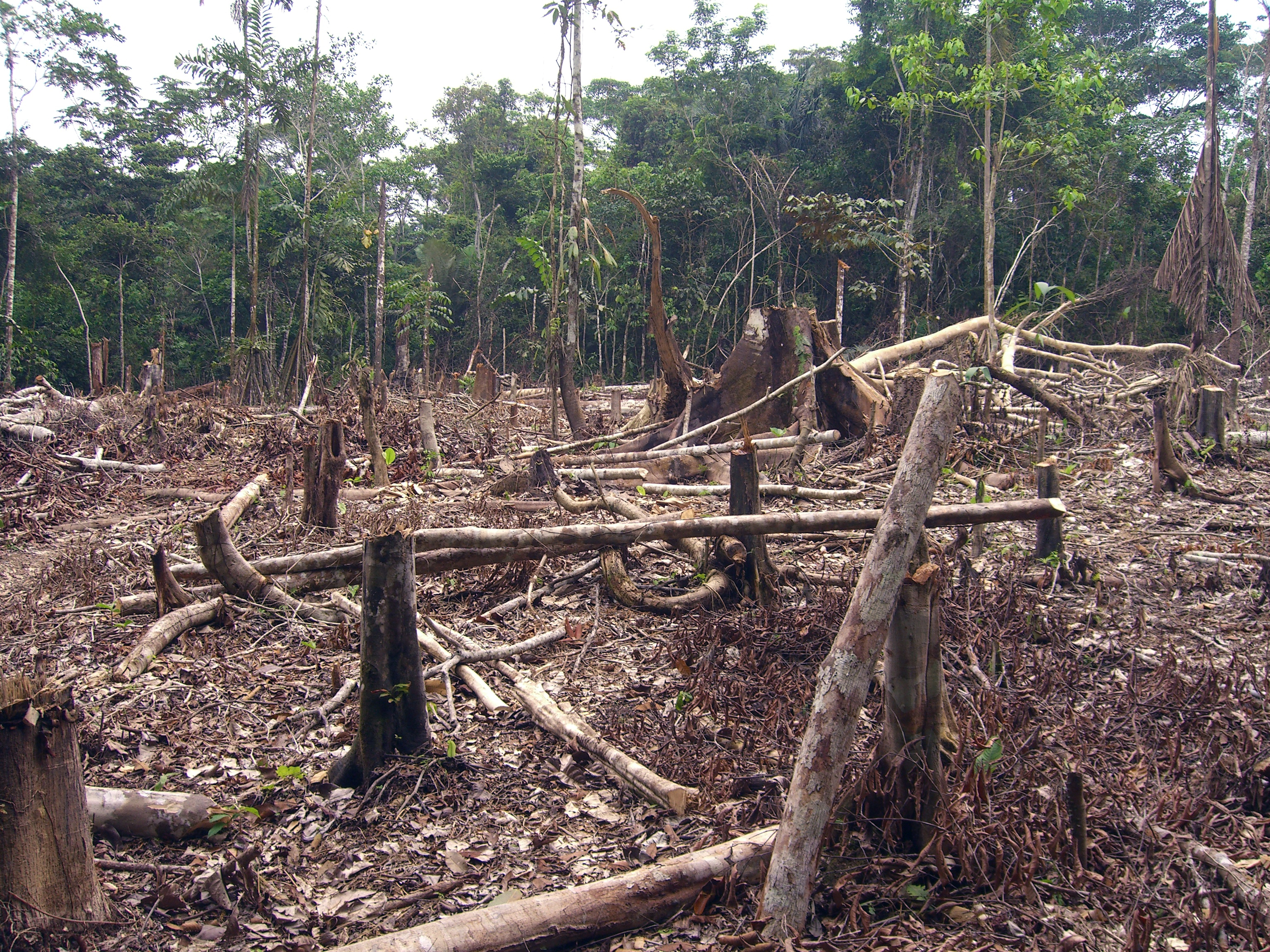
The results of slash-and-burn agriculture in the Colombian Amazon

Colombia loses 2,000 km^{2} of forest annually to deforestation, according to the United Nations in 2003. Some suggest that this figure is as high as 3,000 km^{2} due to illegal logging in the region. Deforestation results mainly from logging for timber, small-scale agricultural ranching, mining, development of energy resources such as hydroelectricity, infrastructure, cocaine production, and farming.

Deforestation in Colombia is mainly targeted at primary rainforests. This has a profound ecological impact in that Colombia is extremely rich in biodiversity, with 10% of the world's species, making it the second most biologically diverse country on Earth.

In 2024, deforestation in Colombia's Amazon region has increased by 40% during the first quarter compared to the same period last year, according to a report. This rise in deforestation is occurring amidst the influence of a strong El Niño weather phenomenon, causing dry and hot conditions that have led to droughts and fires throughout Colombia.

=== Peru ===
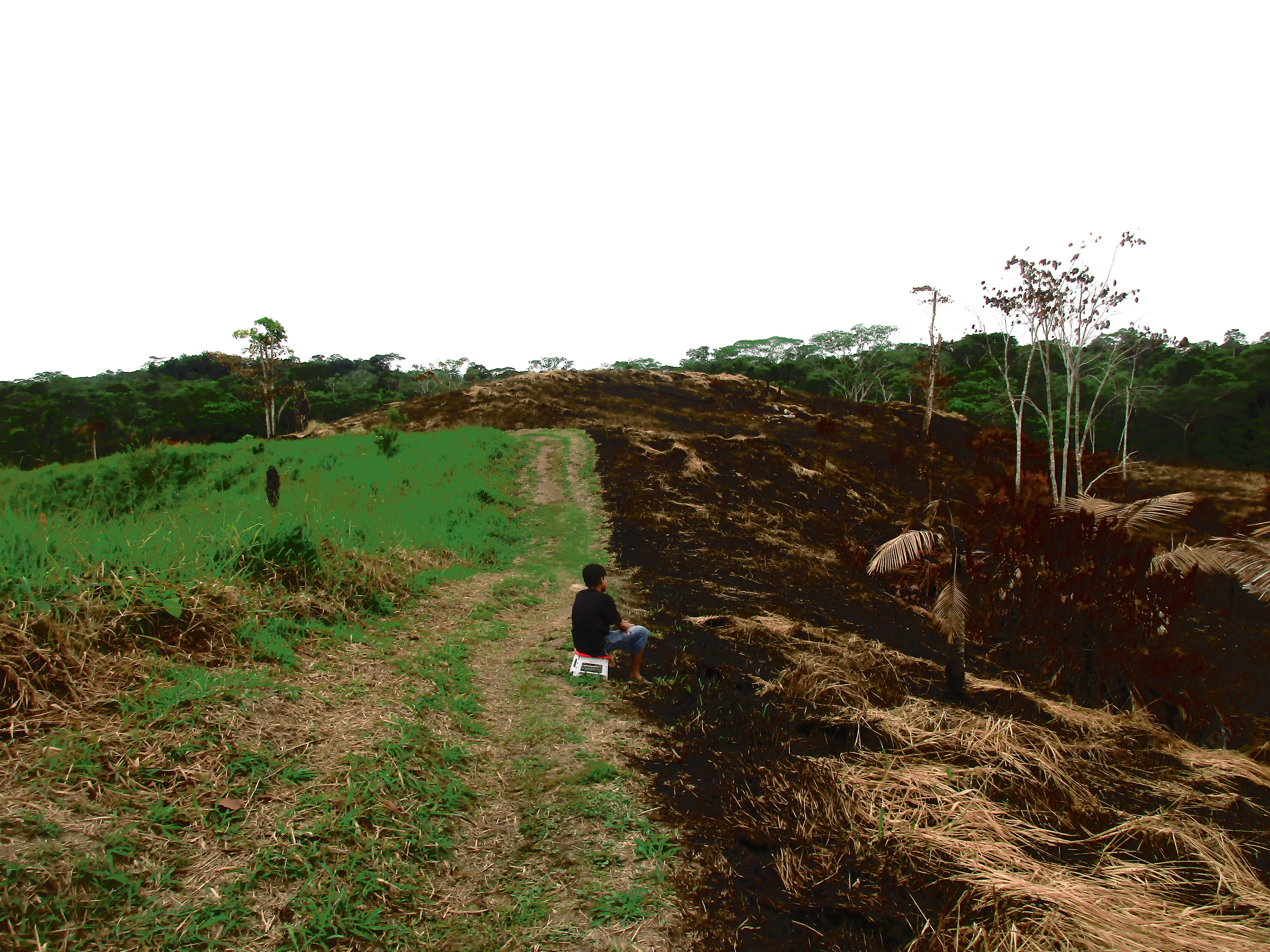
Deforestation in Barrio Floridos, Iquitos.

Deforestation in Peru is the destruction and removal of trees for non-forest use in Peru. As of 2013, more than 60% of Peru's land mass was covered by tropical forests, including the Peruvian Amazonia. According to the Ministry of Environment (Peru), the country lost 2.2 million hectares of tropical forest area, mostly in the Amazonian regions of Loreto, San Martín and Ucayali, between 2001 and 2018. According to Global Forest Watch, this was a 3.1% decrease in primary rain forest area during that period.147,000 additional hectares of tropical forest were removed in 2024. In 2014, the map of the Peruvian Amazon showed that more than 25% of the lost forest area was part of indigenous territories and protected natural areas. Deforestation directly leads to habitat destruction and the degradation of forests, which can compromise biodiversity and hinder the process of carbon capture. Causes of deforestation in Peru include subsistence agriculture, cattle ranching, logging, mining, and drug trafficking operations.

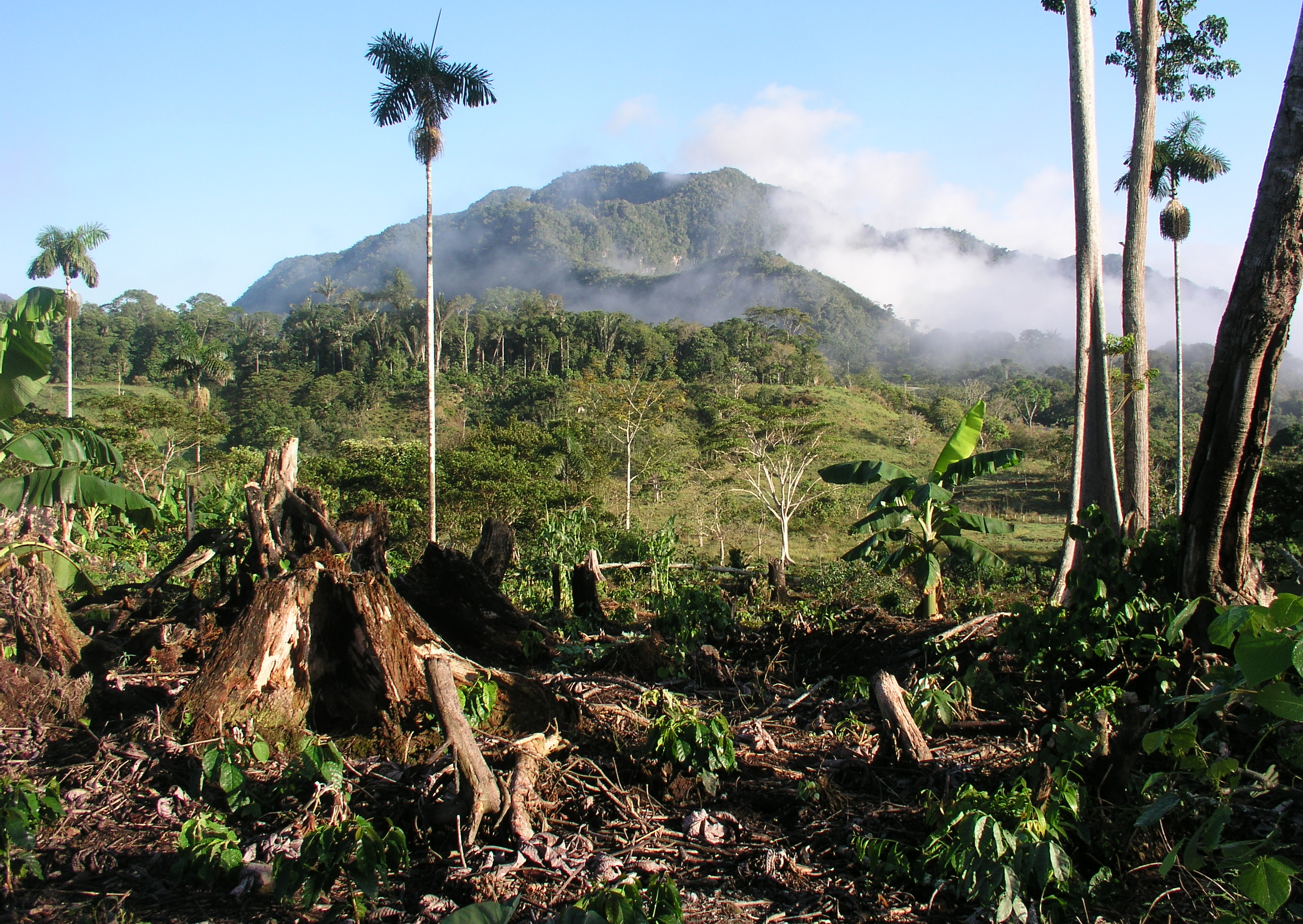
A recently deforested area in Nueva Cajamarca (Rioja, San Martin, Péru).

== See also ==
- Indian Council of Forestry Research and Education
- List of conservation issues
- List of environmental issues
- Reducing emissions from deforestation and forest degradation (REDD)
