= Deforestation in Peru =

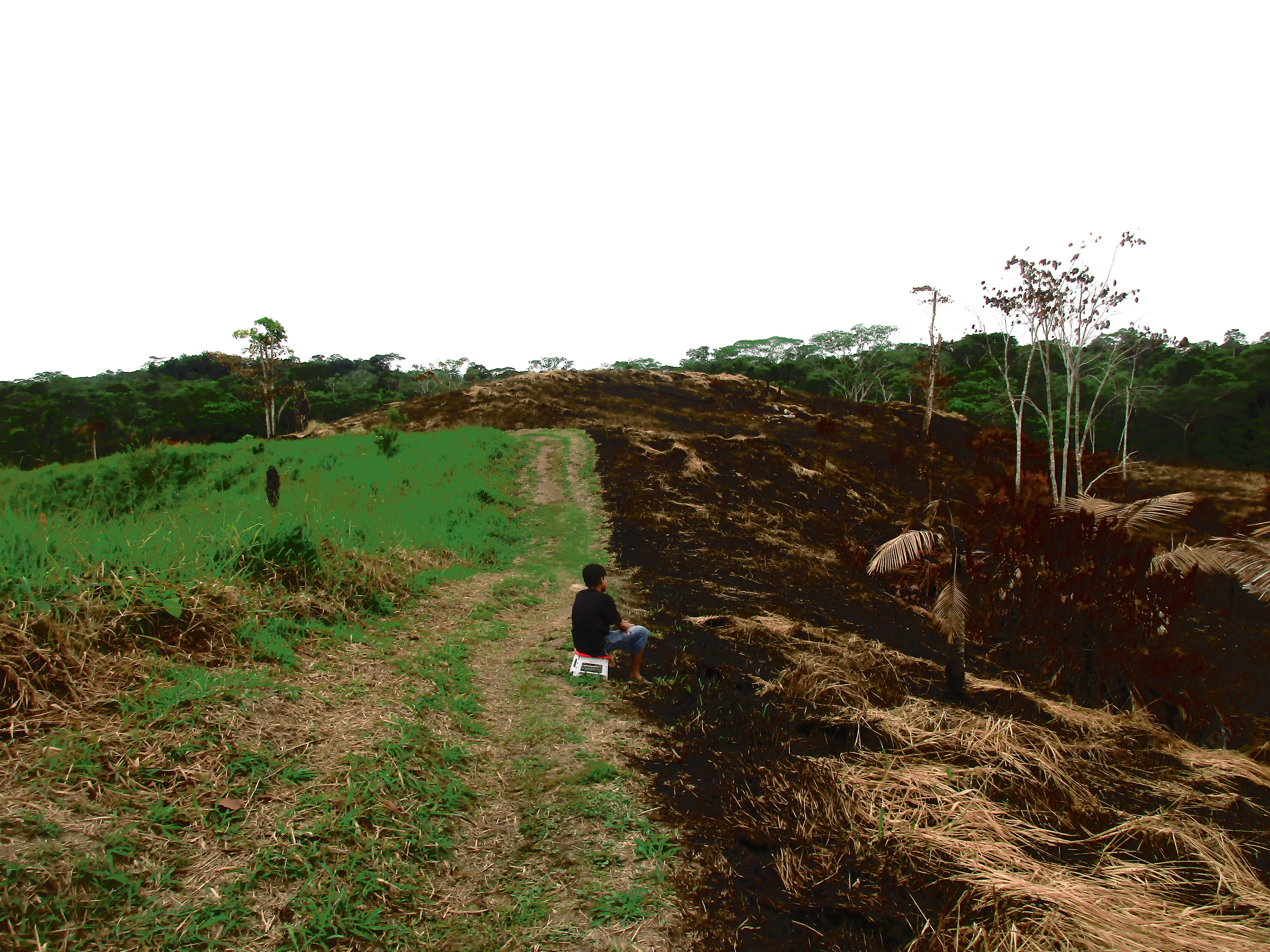
Deforestation in Barrio Floridos, Iquitos.

Deforestation in Peru is the destruction and removal of trees for non-forest use in Peru. As of 2013, more than 60% of Peru's land mass was covered by tropical forests, including the Peruvian Amazonia. According to the Ministry of Environment (Peru), the country lost 2.2 million hectares of tropical forest area, mostly in the Amazonian regions of Loreto, San Martín and Ucayali, between 2001 and 2018. According to Global Forest Watch, this was a 3.1% decrease in primary rain forest area during that period.147,000 additional hectares of tropical forest were removed in 2024. In 2014, the map of the Peruvian Amazon showed that more than 25% of the lost forest area was part of indigenous territories and protected natural areas. Deforestation directly leads to habitat destruction and the degradation of forests, which can compromise biodiversity and hinder the process of carbon capture. Causes of deforestation in Peru include subsistence agriculture, cattle ranching, logging, mining, and drug trafficking operations.

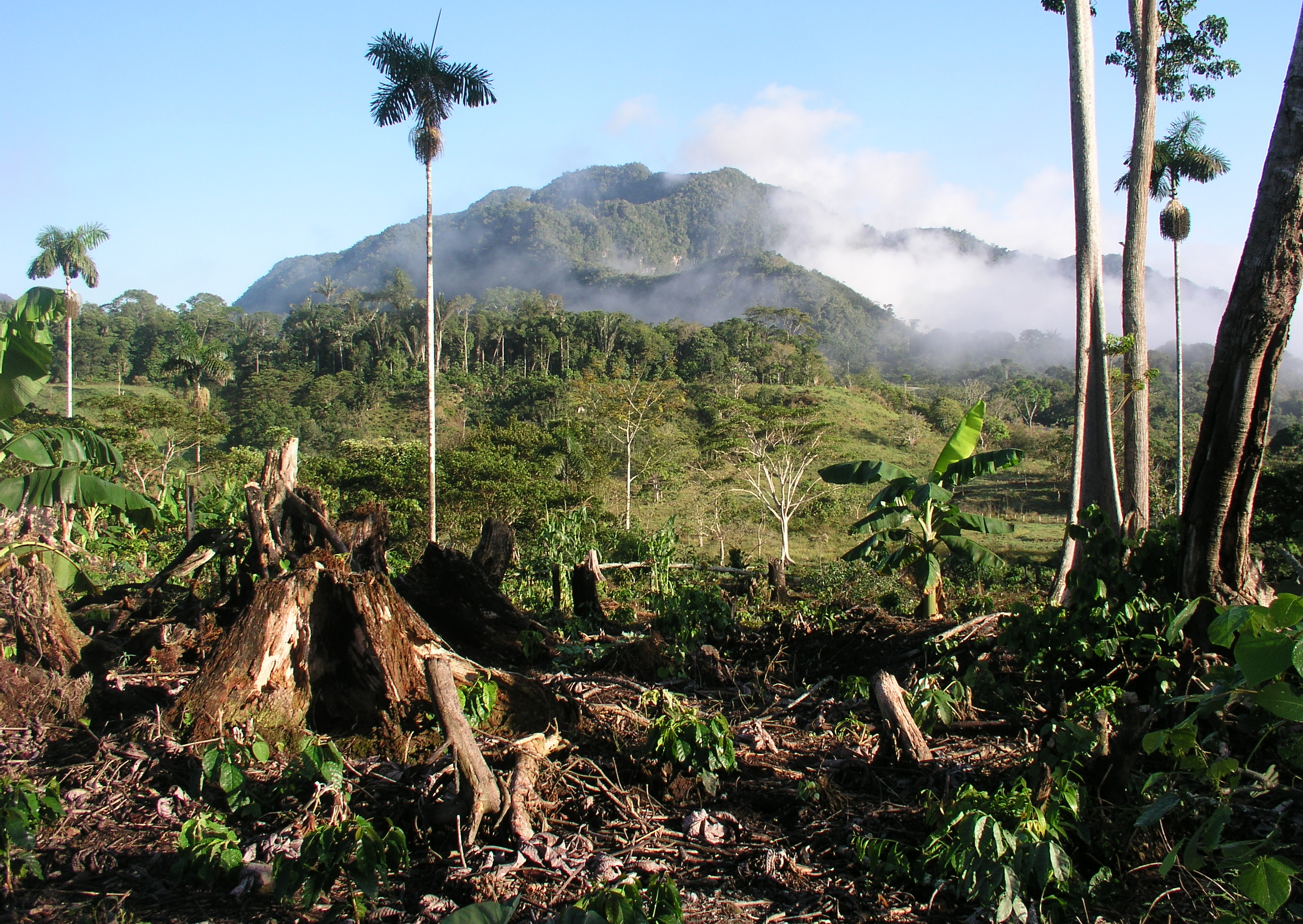
A recently deforested area in Nueva Cajamarca (Rioja, San Martin, Péru).

== Impacts ==
=== Climate and Global Warming ===
Deforestation leads to a degradation of forests, which compromises carbon sequestration. Carbon sequestration is an essential process in controlling climate change. Deforestation in tropical regions is often cited as a main driver of the greenhouse effect. The Amazon Rainforest is the world's largest tropical forest by area, which makes it an important region for carbon sequestration, or a carbon sink. Peru's current logging policies allow for the felling of trees with diameters of 41 centimeters or greater, while approximately 90% of the Amazon's above ground carbon are held in trees this size. Due to both deforestation and drought, recent research shows that regions of the Amazon have been net carbon sources since 2021. In 2012, deforestation processes in Peru led to the emission of approximately 80 gigatons of CO_{2} equivalent. In 2018, Peru had a Forest Landscape Integrity Index mean score of 8.86/10, ranking it 14th globally out of 172 countries.

=== Biodiversity ===
Deforestation in Peru's rainforests also impacts biodiversity. Peru's rainforests are epicenters of biodiversity, containing more than 14,500 plant and vertebrate species. Induced wildfires cause much of the habitat destruction seen in the Amazon Rainforest. Peru's tropical forests are wet regions, so species are not adapted to survive fires. A recent study shows that up to 95% of species living in the Amazon Rainforest have been impacted by deforestation in some way since 2001. In the Madre de Dios province, illegal gold mining has caused mercury pollution in the Nanay River, affecting many aquatic species like the Giant River Otter. Coffee, cacao, and palm agriculture have fragmented the habitat of the San Martin Titi Monkey and the Yellow-tailed Woolly Monkey, which are both critically endangered species.

== Causes ==
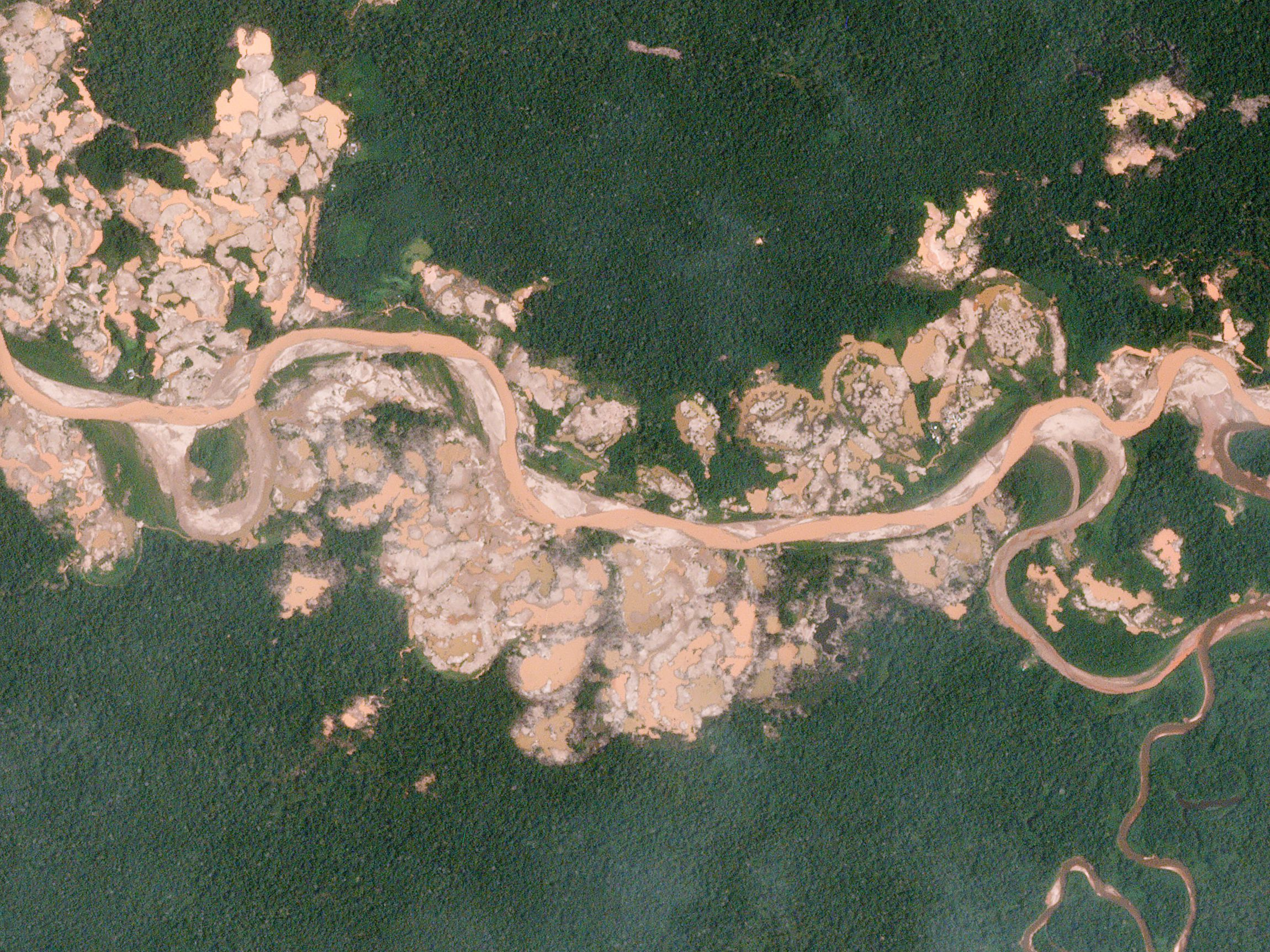
The La Pampa gold mine, located in the Camaná Province of Peru

The most significant cause of deforestation in Peru is small-scale subsistence agriculture, which is responsible for up to 80% of the forest area lost. This is largely due to Peru's high rate of poverty, causing many to turn to subsistence farming or medium-scale farming operations for survival. Another driving factor is illegal logging operations, which are caused by high international demand and regulatory failure. Logging operations have contributed to about 10% of the total forest area lost in Peru. Illegal mining operations also contribute to deforestation. Gold mining alone has caused 139,000 hectares of deforestation in the Madre de Dios province since 1984. Operation Mercury in 2019 was an attempt by Peru's government to dismantle mining sites in Madre de Dios. This operation saw short-term success, but miners returned in greater numbers and across more regions after only a few years.

== Tree cover extent and loss ==
Global Forest Watch publishes annual estimates of tree cover loss and 2000 tree cover extent derived from time-series analysis of Landsat satellite imagery in the Global Forest Change dataset. In this framework, tree cover refers to vegetation taller than 5 m (including natural forests and tree plantations), and tree cover loss is defined as the complete removal of tree cover canopy for a given year, regardless of cause.

For Peru, country statistics report cumulative tree cover loss of 4,350,806 ha (43,508.06 km^{2}) from 2001 to 2024 (about 5.6% of its 2000 tree cover area). For tree cover density greater than 30%, country statistics report a 2000 tree cover extent of 78,063,555 ha (780,635.55 km^{2}). The charts and table below display this data. In simple terms, the annual loss number is the area where tree cover disappeared in that year, and the extent number shows what remains of the 2000 tree cover baseline after subtracting cumulative loss. Forest regrowth is not included in the dataset.

Annual tree cover loss in Peru, 2001–2024. View chart definition.
Tree cover extent in 2000 minus cumulative tree cover loss in Peru, 2001–2024 (loss-only residual; does not account for gain). View chart definition.

Annual tree cover extent and loss
Year	Tree cover extent (km2) (Note: This residual measure does not include forest regrowth.)	Annual tree cover loss (km2)
2001	779,775.47	860.08
2002	778,970.90	804.57
2003	778,232.21	738.69
2004	777,219.11	1,013.10
2005	775,589.16	1,629.95
2006	774,700.13	889.03
2007	773,542.96	1,157.17
2008	772,276.48	1,266.48
2009	770,497.38	1,779.10
2010	769,074.44	1,422.94
2011	767,821.91	1,252.53
2012	765,067.74	2,754.17
2013	762,974.52	2,093.22
2014	760,920.35	2,054.17
2015	759,255.85	1,664.50
2016	756,946.32	2,309.53
2017	753,914.16	3,032.16
2018	751,797.72	2,116.44
2019	749,485.98	2,311.74
2020	746,699.94	2,786.04
2021	744,448.88	2,251.06
2022	742,088.27	2,360.61
2023	739,812.26	2,276.01
2024	737,127.49	2,684.77

== REDD+ reference levels and monitoring ==
Under the UNFCCC REDD+ framework, Peru has submitted two subnational forest reference emission level (FREL) packages for the Amazon biome. On the UNFCCC REDD+ Web Platform, both the 2016 and 2021 packages are listed as having assessed reference levels, together with a reported national strategy and safeguards information, while a national forest monitoring system is listed as "not reported" for both packages.

The first assessed FREL, technically assessed in 2016, covered the REDD+ activity "reducing emissions from deforestation" in the Peruvian Amazon biome. Using a 2001-2014 historical reference period and a trend projection of gross deforestation emissions, it set annual benchmark values for 2015-2020 rising from 77,570,486 to 93,703,903 t CO2 eq per year. The technical assessment states that the benchmark included above-ground biomass and below-ground biomass, reported CO2 only, and excluded deadwood, litter and soil organic carbon.

A second subnational FREL, technically assessed in 2022, again covered reducing emissions from deforestation in the Amazon biome. Using a 2010-2019 historical reference period, the modified and assessed FREL was 78,927,827.50 t CO2 eq per year, revised from 75,774,039.55 t CO2 eq per year in the original submission. The technical assessment states that it represented the annual average of CO2 emissions from gross deforestation and included above-ground biomass, below-ground biomass, deadwood and litter, while excluding soil organic carbon.
