= Deforestation in India =

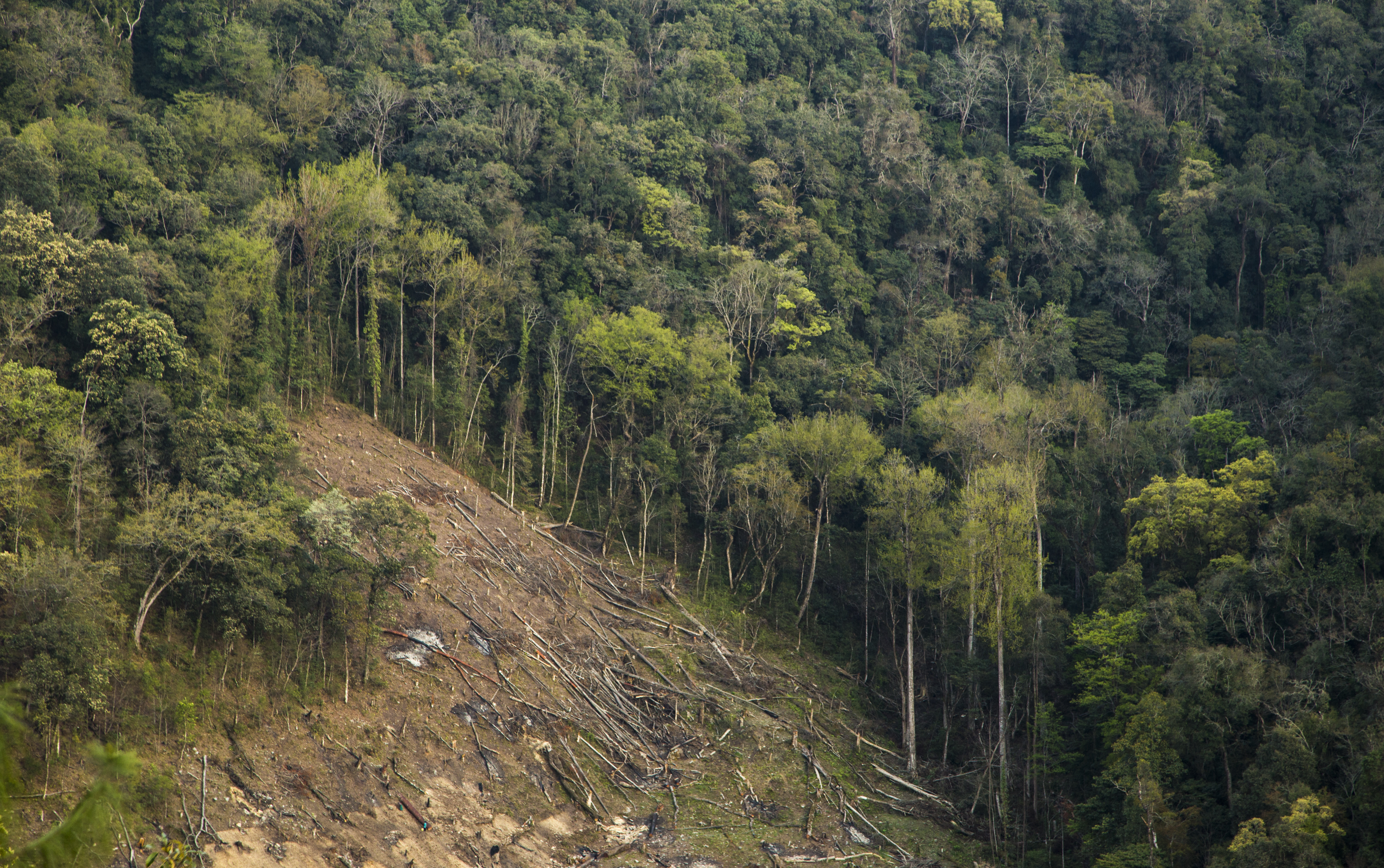
Deforestation in Arunachal Pradesh.

Deforestation in India is the widespread destruction of major forests in India. It is mainly caused by environmental degradation by farmers, ranches, loggers and plantation corporations. In 2009, India ranked 10th worldwide in the amount of forest loss, where world annual deforestation is estimated as 13.7 million hectares (34×10^{6} acres) a year.

== History ==
India has experienced Deforestation since 2nd Millennium BCE. Settlements in the Gangetic Plains were spread out. When the Indo-Aryans arrived they brought with them tools like Copper and Bronze, but this did not help in deforestation. Only when the use of Iron became common did deforestation began to drastically affect the Gangetic Plains. Large-scale clearing began around the 6th century BCE, driven by the need for agricultural land (specifically rice cultivation) and fuel for smelting.

The Deccan Region is believed to have been a very forested area. A research paper titled "Utilizing traditional literature to triangulate the ecological history of a tropical savanna" by Ashish Nerlekar and Digvijay Patil published in the Science journal People and Nature, used Marathi literature and folksongs to find out about the environment of Desh region which is part of the Deccan. From the research it has been found out that there, the landscape has remained consistent over at least 750 years, contrary to what was believed earlier.

Deforestation started with the growth of agriculture, but was exacerbated in the nineteenth century when British commercial forestry operations destroyed forests in mountain areas of Kerala, Tamil Nadu and Karnataka. The Gangetic plains were also heavily affected.

== Dynamics ==
Deforestation has several causes including colonization, agricultural expansion, firewood collection, timber harvesting and extension of cultivation on slopes. In the Indian Himalayas debris thrown down slopes due to the reckless use of excavator machines for widening roads and making of new roads has destroyed vast areas of Forest. Due to colonization, trees were cut down as a primary source of fuel. Felled trees are used for cooking food and other daily needs which require fuel.

== Tree cover extent and loss ==
Global Forest Watch publishes annual estimates of tree cover loss and 2000 tree cover extent derived from time-series analysis of Landsat satellite imagery in the Global Forest Change dataset. In this framework, tree cover refers to vegetation taller than 5 m (including natural forests and tree plantations), and tree cover loss is defined as the complete removal of tree cover canopy for a given year, regardless of cause.

For India, the dashboard reports that from 2001 to 2024 the country lost about 2,300,000 ha (23,000 km^{2}) of tree cover (about 7.0% of its 2000 tree cover area). For tree cover density greater than 30%, country statistics report a 2000 tree cover extent of 32,620,759 ha (326,207.59 km^{2}). The charts and table below display this data. In simple terms, the annual loss number is the area where tree cover disappeared in that year, and the extent number shows what remains of the 2000 tree cover baseline after subtracting cumulative loss. Forest regrowth is not included in the dataset.

Annual tree cover loss in India, 2001–2024. View chart definition.
Tree cover extent in 2000 minus cumulative tree cover loss in India, 2001–2024 (loss-only residual; does not account for gain). View chart definition.

Annual tree cover loss
Year	Tree cover extent (km2) (Note: This residual measure does not include forest regrowth.)	Annual tree cover loss (km2)
2001	325,639.66	567.93
2002	325,161.27	478.39
2003	324,722.96	438.31
2004	324,058.84	664.12
2005	323,494.65	564.19
2006	322,884.53	610.12
2007	322,207.21	677.32
2008	321,420.80	786.41
2009	320,679.25	741.55
2010	320,204.84	474.41
2011	319,370.69	834.15
2012	318,490.58	880.11
2013	317,736.51	754.07
2014	316,415.79	1,320.72
2015	315,319.02	1,096.77
2016	313,677.52	1,641.50
2017	311,884.91	1,792.61
2018	310,631.96	1,252.95
2019	309,472.92	1,159.04
2020	308,164.38	1,308.54
2021	306,906.85	1,257.53
2022	305,764.62	1,142.23
2023	304,397.49	1,367.13
2024	303,137.05	1,260.44

== Results ==
Deforestation has affected the lives of wild animals and birds including bats. Birds like sparrows, pigeons and crows are becoming rarer due to deforestation. Due to deforestation, India is facing water problems in urban cities and villages.

== REDD+ forest reference level and monitoring ==
India has made submissions under the UNFCCC REDD+ framework, including a National REDD+ Strategy, a safeguards information summary and a national forest reference level (FRL) that has undergone a UNFCCC technical assessment. The UNFCCC REDD+ Web Platform lists India’s forest monitoring system as “not reported” as a standalone submission for the 2018 documentation, although monitoring information is discussed within the FRL documentation.

In 2018 India submitted a national FRL covering the REDD+ activity “sustainable management of forests”. The FRL is based on the average annual carbon stock increment associated with a net increase in forest area over the 2000–2008 reference period, using satellite-derived forest cover assessments for 2000, 2004 and 2008 and emission factors drawing on national forest inventory data and Forest Survey of India studies. The UNFCCC technical assessment reported an assessed FRL of −49,700,000 tonnes of carbon dioxide equivalent (t CO2 eq) per year.

For this FRL, India applied a forest definition of lands larger than 1 hectare with tree canopy density above 10% irrespective of ownership or legal status (including orchards, bamboo and palm). The FRL includes all five carbon pools (above- and below-ground biomass, deadwood, litter and soil organic carbon) and reports only CO2. The UNFCCC technical assessment noted that the information provided was only partially transparent and not complete, and identified areas for future technical improvement.

== See also ==
- Environmental issues in India
