= Yoichi Kuroda =

Japanese environmentalist

- Organization: Japan Tropical Forest Action Network (JATAN)
- Awards: Goldman Environmental Prize (1991)

Yoichi Kuroda (黒田 洋一, Kuroda Yōichi) is a Japanese environmentalist. He was awarded the Goldman Environmental Prize in 1991 for his campaign against Japan's irresponsible use of tropical hardwoods.

He was founder of the activist organization Japan Tropical Forest Action Network (JATAN).

== See also ==
- Deforestation in Japan
