= Iquitos District =

Coordinates: 3.7494°S 73.2443°W

Iquitos
- District
- Interactive map of Iquitos
- Country: Peru
- Region: Loreto
- Province: Maynas
- Founded: February 7, 1866
- Capital: Iquitos

Government
  - Mayor: Salomon Abensur Diaz

Area
  - Total: 358.15 km^{2} (138.28 sq mi)
- Elevation: 106 m (348 ft)

Population (2005 census)
  - Total: 157,529
  - Density: 439.84/km^{2} (1,139.2/sq mi)
- Time zone: UTC-5 (PET)
- UBIGEO: 160101

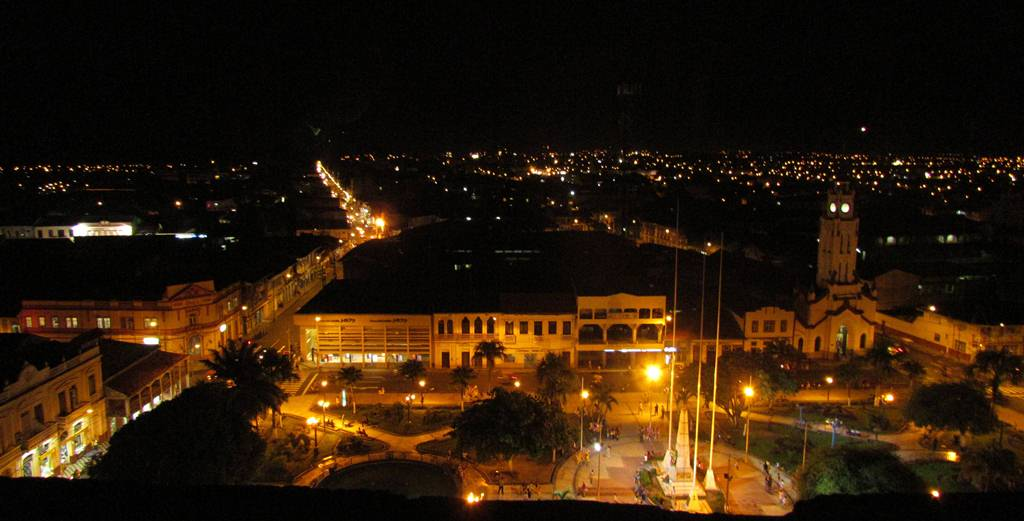
Wide view of Iquitos at night.

Iquitos District is one of thirteen districts of the Maynas Province in Peru.

== Climate ==
Climate data for Amazonas, Iquitos, elevation 113 m (371 ft), (1991–2020)
| Month | Jan | Feb | Mar | Apr | May | Jun | Jul | Aug | Sep | Oct | Nov | Dec | Year |
|---|---|---|---|---|---|---|---|---|---|---|---|---|---|
| Mean daily maximum °C (°F) | 32.0 (89.6) | 32.3 (90.1) | 31.9 (89.4) | 31.8 (89.2) | 31.2 (88.2) | 30.9 (87.6) | 31.2 (88.2) | 32.3 (90.1) | 33.1 (91.6) | 32.9 (91.2) | 32.7 (90.9) | 32.1 (89.8) | 32.0 (89.7) |
| Mean daily minimum °C (°F) | 23.1 (73.6) | 23.1 (73.6) | 22.8 (73.0) | 22.9 (73.2) | 22.6 (72.7) | 22.4 (72.3) | 22.0 (71.6) | 22.1 (71.8) | 22.5 (72.5) | 22.9 (73.2) | 23.1 (73.6) | 23.0 (73.4) | 22.7 (72.9) |
| Average precipitation mm (inches) | 224.4 (8.83) | 201.6 (7.94) | 241.1 (9.49) | 221.9 (8.74) | 197.4 (7.77) | 176.7 (6.96) | 133.7 (5.26) | 127.6 (5.02) | 152.0 (5.98) | 224.3 (8.83) | 257.2 (10.13) | 227.9 (8.97) | 2,385.8 (93.92) |
Source: National Meteorology and Hydrology Service of Peru
