= Global Forest Watch =

Forest monitoring web application

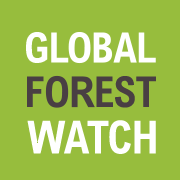

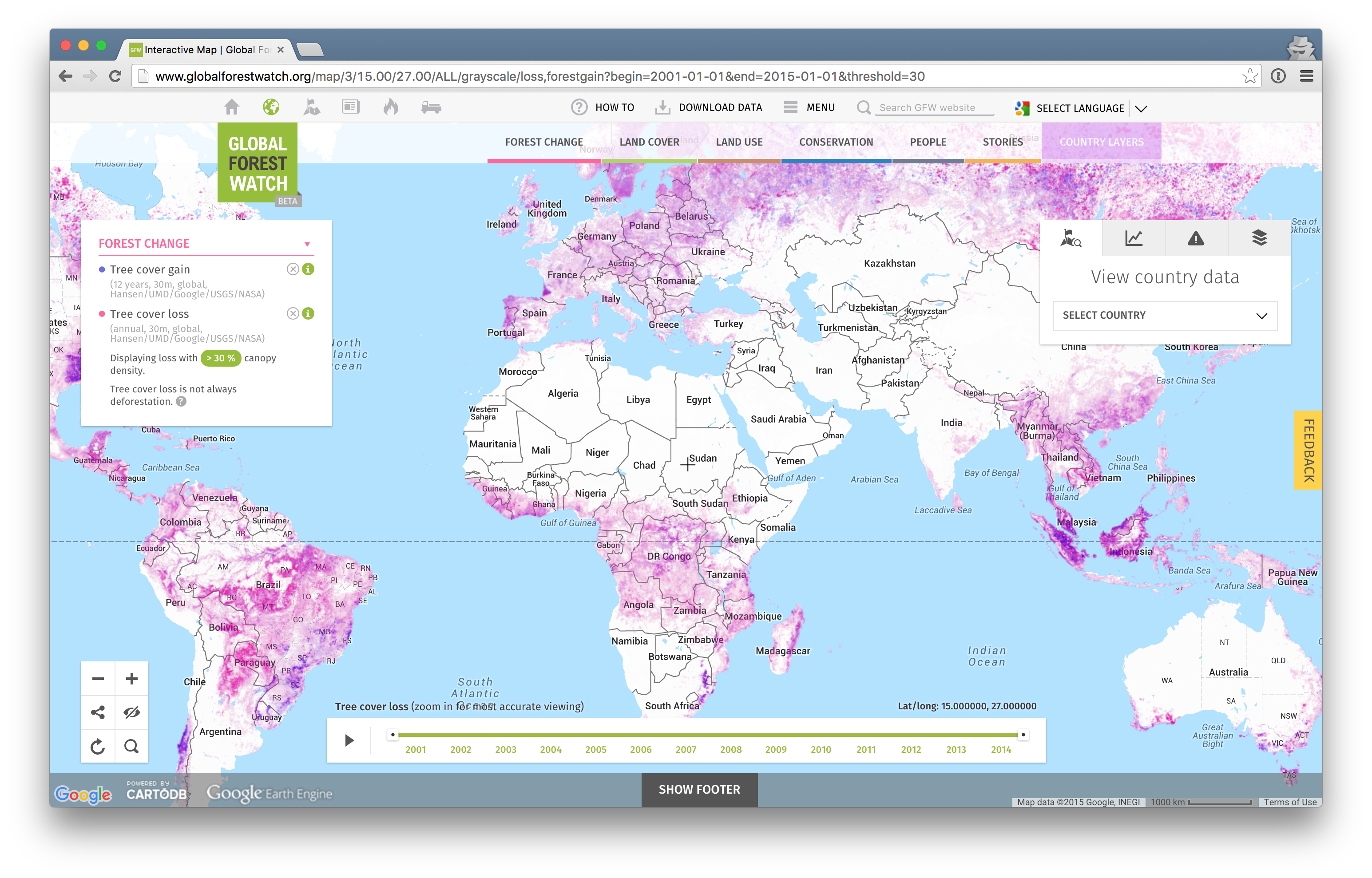
- Screenshot GFW map (2015)
- Owner: World Resources Institute
- Website: globalforestwatch.org
- Commercial: No
- Launched: February 22, 2014; 12 years ago
- Current status: Online
- Written in: HTML, Ruby, JavaScript, CSS, Shell

Global Forest Watch (GFW) is an open-source web application to monitor global forests in near real-time. GFW is an initiative of the World Resources Institute (WRI), with partners including Google, USAID, the University of Maryland (UMD), Esri, Vizzuality and many other academic, non-profit, public, and private organizations. It is known for hosting and publishing datasets related to the Global Forest Change dataset.

== History ==
Global Forest Watch originally began in 1997 as an initiative to establish a global forest monitoring network, convened by the World Resources Institute and partners.

The initiative was rebooted in 2013 with data from the Center for Global Development derived from NASA's MODIS sensor, with additional layers subsequently added from Google/UMD, Imazon, Terra-i, and NASA. The second iteration of GFW was released in February 2014, and continues to add information at multiple time scales and spatial resolutions to track deforestation. The GFW Commodities and GFW Fires sub-pages were subsequently released.

GFW contributed notable data and analysis to reporting on the 2015 Southeast Asian haze crisis, including revealing that approximately 35% of the fires in Indonesia occurred in agricultural concessions. This reporting linked the forest fires to specific companies.

== Use cases ==
The GFW platform has been used in a number of notable applications. The forest change data have been used to measure global deforestation rates and to detect and monitor illegal clearing activity, primarily in Indonesia. The NASA Active Fires data, displayed within GFW Fires, have been used to identify illegal burning that has caused the 2015 Southeast Asian haze crisis (see Haze crisis). Multinational companies use the GFW platform to track their supply chain, purportedly ensuring that they meet "no deforestation" commitments.

== Data sets ==
There are currently five categories of data sets available on the GFW site, which are updated at various frequencies and available at various spatial resolutions.

=== Forest Change Data ===
- Brazilian Amazon SAD alerts
- Near-global QUICC alerts
- Humid tropics FORMA alerts
- Tree cover gain
- Latin America Terra-i alerts
- Tree cover loss
- NASA Active Fires
- Guatemala Forest Change 2001–2010
- USA land cover change 2001 to 2011

=== Forest Cover Data ===
- Tropical forest carbon stocks (2000)
- Indonesia primary forest (2000)
- Indonesia peat lands (2002)
- Indonesia land cover (2006)
- Mangrove forests
- Tree cover (2000)
- Intact Forest Landscapes (2000)
- Brazilian Amazon SAD alerts
- USA Land Cover (2011)
- Global Land Cover
- Cameroon Forest Management Units
- Guatemala Forest Cover
- Romania tree cover

=== Forest Use Data ===
- Logging concessions (select countries)
- Wood fiber concessions (select countries)
- Mining concessions (select countries)
- Oil palm concessions (select countries)
- Eucalyptus concessions (select countries)
- Major dams
- Forest titles (select countries)

=== Conservation Data ===
- Tiger Conservation Landscapes
- Terai Arc Landscape Corridors
- Indonesia forest moratorium
- Biodiversity hotspots
- Alliance for Zero Extinction Sites
- Protected areas
- Endemic Bird Areas
- Indonesia oil palm suitability standard

=== People Data ===
- Resource rights (select countries)
- Indigenous lands (select countries)
- Population density (2000)

== Awards ==
- Computerworld Editors' Choice Award (2015)
- United Nations Big Data Climate Challenge (2014)
- Boreal Award, GFW Canada (2010)
