= 2012 Loreto floods =

2012 floods in Loreto, Peru

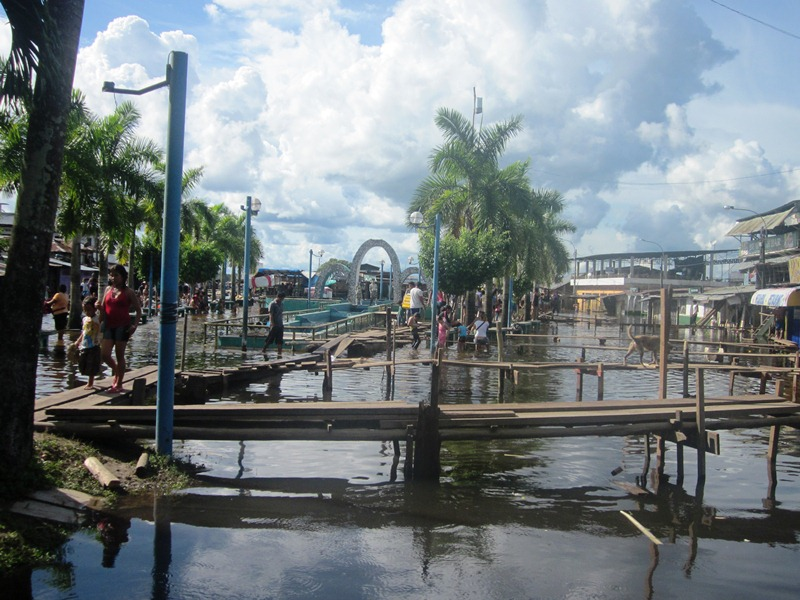
- Bellavista-Nanay, located in northern Iquitos, is one of the areas that has been affected by flooding.
- Date: February 2012 – April 2012
- Location: Loreto Province; Trompeteros District; Tigre District Requena Province; Maquia District; Requena District Maynas Province; Iquitos (capital city); Fernando Lores District; Las Amazonas District Ucayali Province; Sarayacu District Mariscal Ramon Castilla Province; San Pablo District; Yavari District Source:
- Deaths: 7–8

The 2012 Loreto floods were an orange-alert weather event that affected Loreto Region, Peru that took place in the first months of 2012. February and March were the wettest months along the Peruvian Amazon. The area most affected in Loreto were villages, towns and coasts of the provincial capital, Iquitos. It was the first and strongest historical flood series in the history of Loreto, preceding the floods in 1986.

Wet weather in Loreto brought downpours and much drizzle, causing damage and flooding to the Loreto Region since November 2011. The rainy weather continued into early 2012, and the water level rose in the Amazon —extensive stream that feeds most of the Loreto tributaries— to 117 m. From February and March, several towns were affected (19,209–18,400 affected families), 26 000 hectares of farmland were flooded and water level reached the coastal streets of Iquitos. Other sites concerned were in the Ucayali Region. At the end of April, the water levels began to decrease.

It was anticipated that the floods would increase the risk of dengue and malaria in the following dry season due to the proliferation of mosquitoes.

== Event ==
Before the rains causes the rise in the rivers in Loreto Region in January 2012, a subtle rainy weather began in the region since September 2011. In January 2012, in several cities of Perú, (e.g. Piura, Tumbes, Lambayeque, Cusco, among others) were initially affected by intense rains.

The rains were increasing their strength, and became persistent downpours, which were unloaded every night. Later, on March 12, 2012, the National Service of Meteorology and Hydrology reported that the rivers Huallaga (+133.68 m), Ucayali (+132.11 m), Marañón (+122.72 m) and Amazon (+117.06 m) exceeded water levels, and declared a hydrological red alert. From the February 14, 2012, The region was hit by the first serious flooding, and since then, it took emergency measures to the affected families.

On March 21, 2012, the Regional Government of Loreto prepared a state of emergency in the region, when there were 40,000 flood victims. However, the state of emergency was finally declared until March 30, 2012, when the number of homeless rose to 100,000, a belated action that was frowned by the population. On the same date, it was reported that the Amazon River was at 1.94 meters from its normal level.

In Iquitos, Nanay and Itaya rivers were the cause of flooding. The areas most affected were the rural communities of Belén District, neighborhood and Bellavista-Nanay. Also, main roads such as Prolongation Putumayo and La Marina Avenue were affected.

=== Possible red-alert flood ===
"The trend is that it continues to grow. There is a warning of rain across the southern mountains and the waters that accumulate will come indirectly to the Amazon. The river may grow to the third week of April."

— said Marco Paredes, regional head of Senamhi.

Until the first week of April, the water level rose 118.62 meters, surpassing its previous peak flood that occurred in 1986 (118.58 m), and approaching a dangerous 119 meters. Due to the Amazon River is fed by the southern region of Arequipa —born specifically on the slopes of Nevado Mismi, the Peruvian Andes is the area affected by rains. Marco Paredes, regional head of Senamhi, stated that erratic rains had begun after that the La Niña of 2011 will impact climate in the sierra.

== Damage ==
The weather event is leaving 200.000 victims to date. In the Punchana District in Iquitos, the flood reached the cemetery the Immaculate, which could cause water pollution from the bodies. Due to the proximity, the neighbors may get diseases.

Faced with an alarming and steady growth, electricity was cut off to prevent hazardous short. Also reported the apparition of strange aquatic animals that threatens the lives of those affected.
