= Nuevo Tarapacá =

Nuevo Tarapacá Nuevo Tarapacá
- Municipality and town
- Location in Peru
- Coordinates: 4°02′19″S 73°06′58″W
- Country: Peru
- Department: Loreto
- Province: Maynas
- District: Fernando Lores
- Time zone: UTC-5 (Peru Standard Time)
- Climate: Af

Nuevo Tarapacá is a Peruvian town, belonging to the Maynas Province in the Fernando Lores District, which is in the Loreto Department on the banks of the Tamshiyacu River, near the district capital of Tamshiyacu.

== History ==
It was founded by Peruvian refugees from the War of the Pacific who had first settled in Tarapacá, which was afterwards awarded to Colombia after the Salomón-Lozano Treaty. Nearby Puerto Arica, originally in Colombia, had a similar fate.

== See also ==
- Tarapacá, Amazonas
- Puerto Arica
- Puerto Arica (Maynas)
- Salomón-Lozano Treaty
