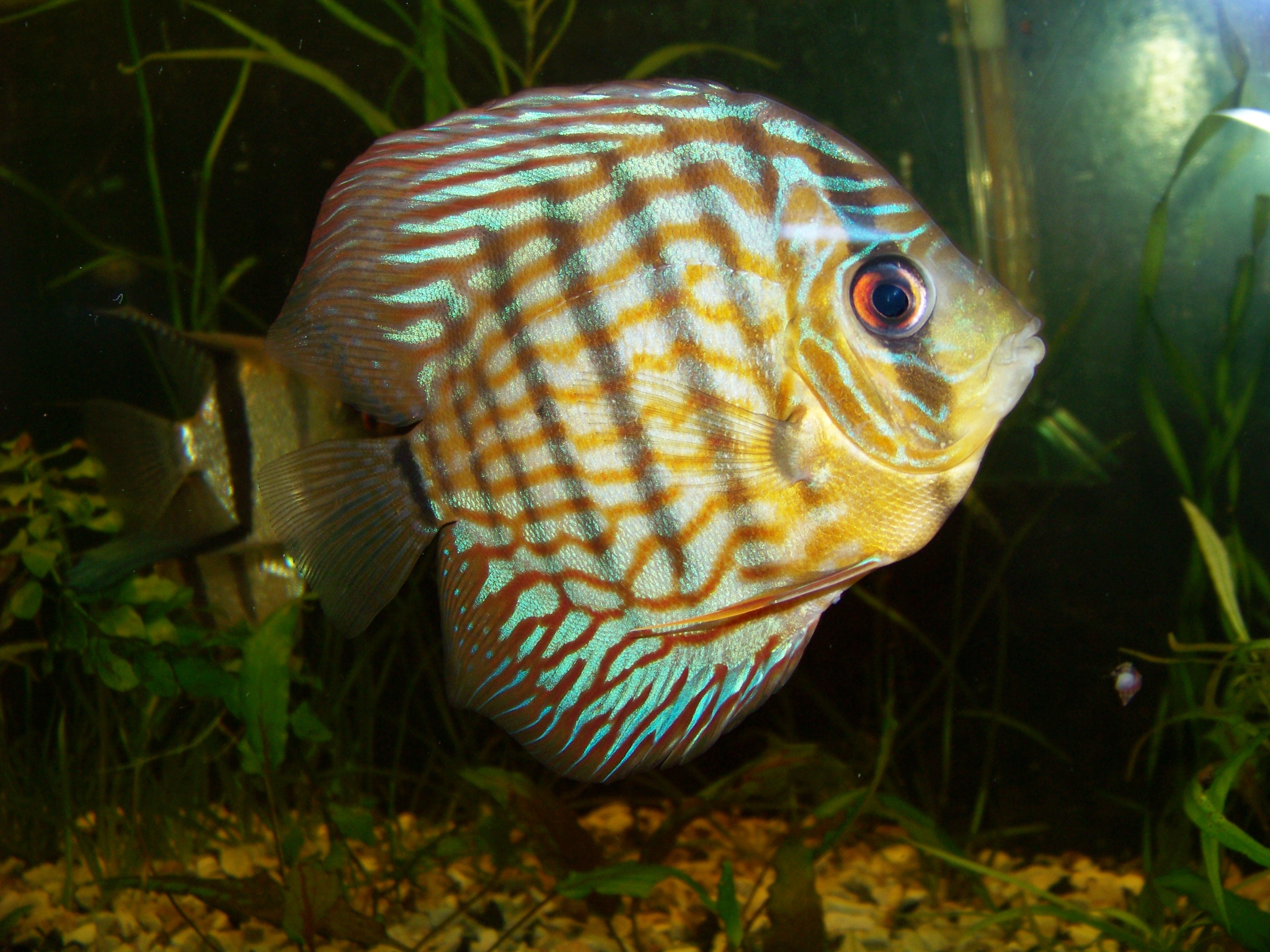

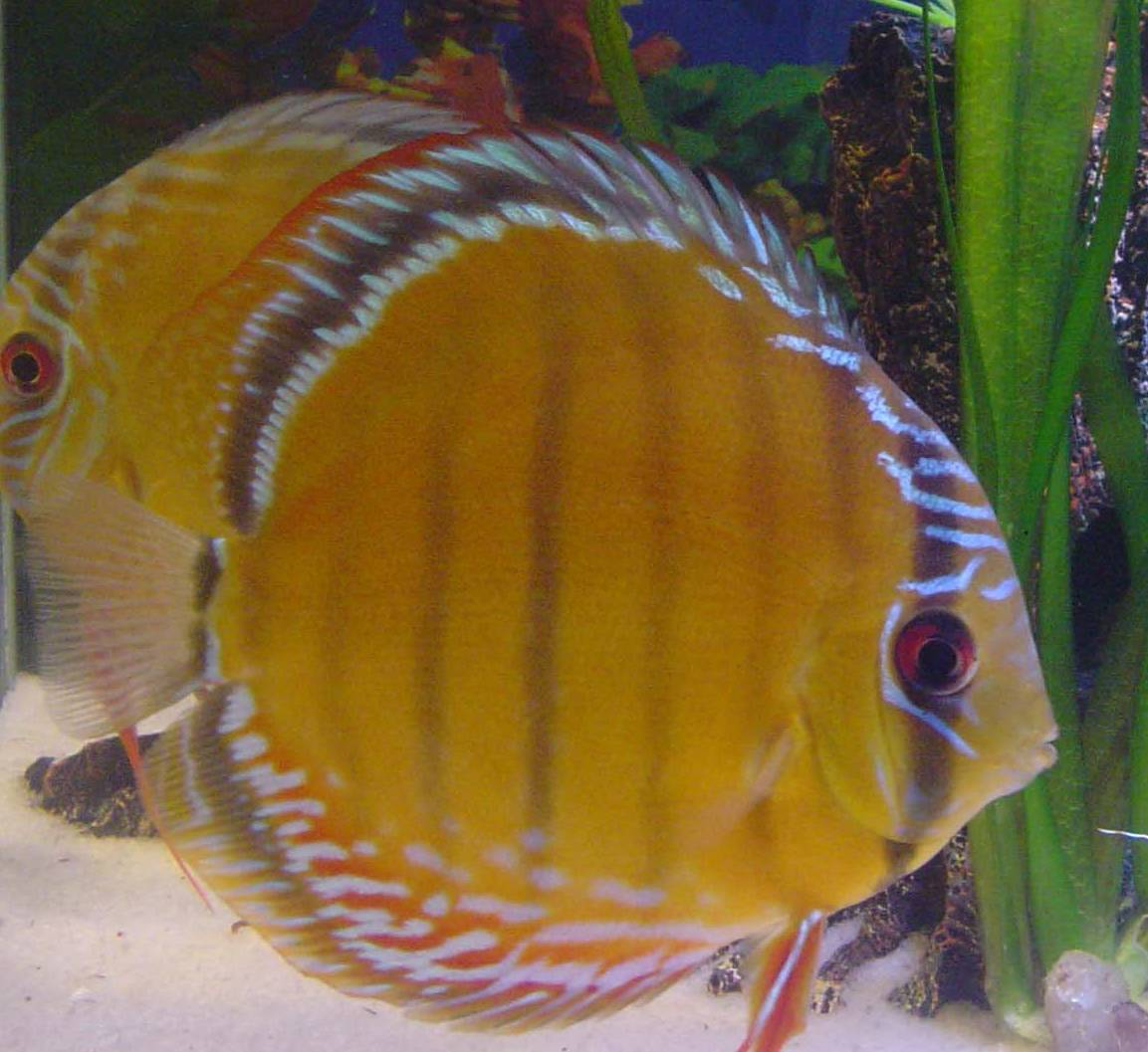
- Blue discus (above) and brown discus (below)

Conservation status
- Least Concern (IUCN 3.1)

Scientific classification
- Kingdom: Animalia
- Phylum: Chordata
- Class: Actinopterygii
- Order: Cichliformes
- Family: Cichlidae
- Genus: Symphysodon
- Species: S. aequifasciatus

Binomial name
- Symphysodon aequifasciatus Pellegrin, 1904

Synonyms
- Symphysodon discus var. aequifasciata Pellegrin, 1904; Symphysodon aequifasciatus aequifasciatus Pellegrin, 1904; Symphysodon aequifasciata haraldi L. P. Schultz, 1960; Symphysodon haraldi L. P. Schultz, 1960; Symphysodon aequifasciata axelrodi L. P. Schultz, 1960; Symphysodon axelrodi L. P. Schultz, 1960

= Symphysodon aequifasciatus =

Species of fish

Symphysodon aequifasciatus, the blue discus or brown discus, is a species of cichlid native to rivers of the eastern and central Amazon Basin downriver from the Purus Arch. This discus is found in black-, clear- and whitewater, but its preference for lentic habitats such as floodplains and flooded forests means that the whitewater it inhabits contain little suspended material (unlike main sections of whitewater rivers). It is largely restricted to water with a high temperature of 25–32 °C (77–90 °F) and a pH of 5.2–7.7.

It typically reaches a length of up to 15.2 centimetres (6 in) SL, but captives have been claimed to reach 23 cm (9 in). It is commonly kept in aquariums.

== Taxonomy ==
The taxonomy is disputed, but FishBase follows a review of the genus from 2006.

In 2007 it was suggested that the correct scientific name of the blue/brown discus is S. haraldi, whereas S. aequifasciatus is the correct name for the green discus.

In 2011 a study indicated that it should be split into three: Brown discus (S. aequifasciatus; East Amazon downriver from Meeting of Waters), blue discus (S. sp. 1; central Amazon from Purus Arch to the Meeting of Waters) and the Xingu group (S. sp. 2; Xingu and Tocantins). The Xingu group currently lacks a scientific name, but it is possible that the correct name for the blue is S. haraldi. This taxonomy where both S. haraldi and S. aequifasciatus are recognized as described valid species has been adopted by the Catalog of Fishes. Some hybridization occurs (or has occurred) between the species recognized in the 2011 study and also between the brown and Heckel discus (S. discus), but overall they maintain their separate evolutionary trajectories.
