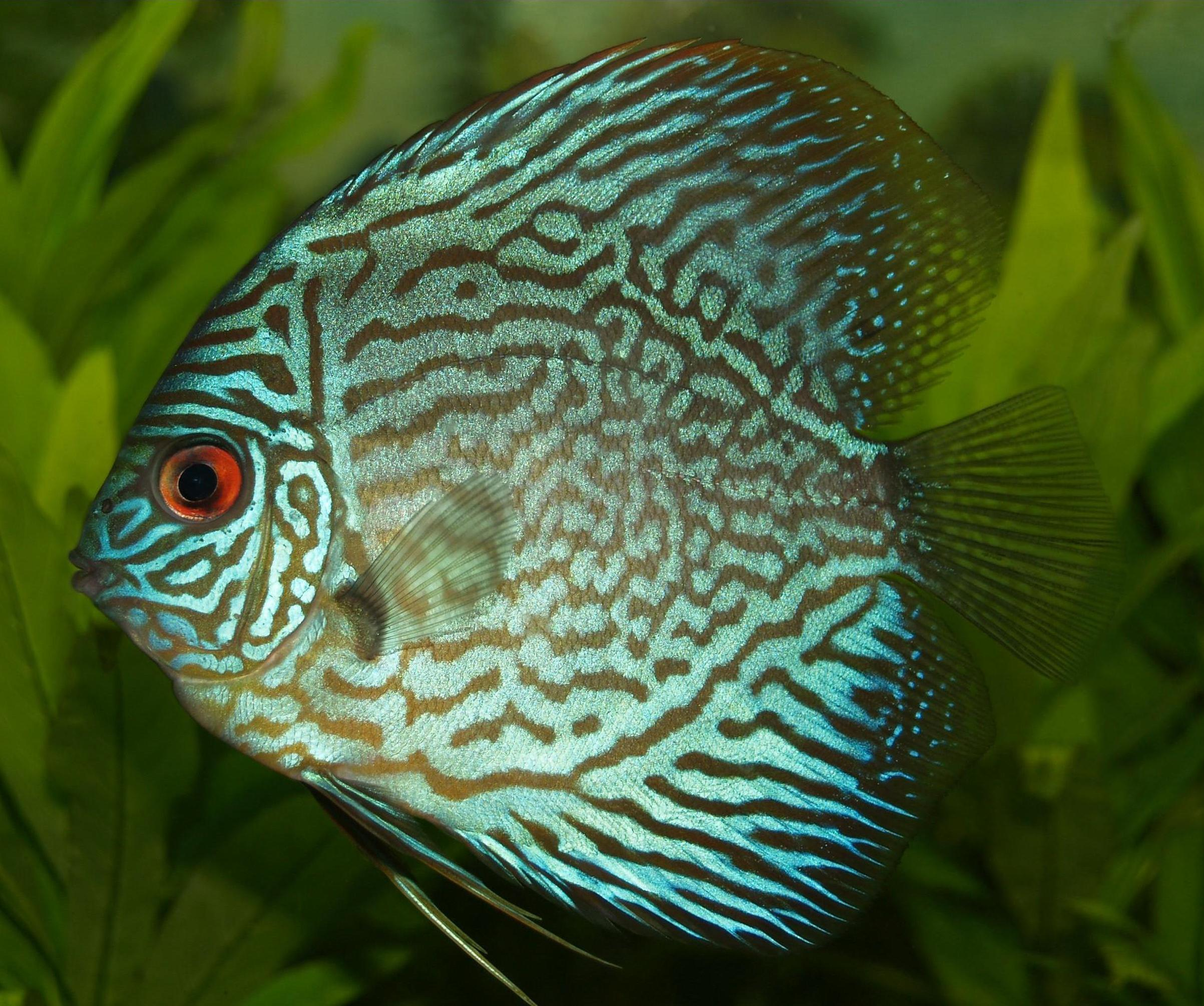
- Symphysodon aequifasciatus

Scientific classification
- Kingdom: Animalia
- Phylum: Chordata
- Class: Actinopterygii
- Division: Teleostei
- Order: Cichliformes
- Family: Cichlidae
- Tribe: Heroini
- Genus: Symphysodon; Heckel, 1840

Type species
- Symphysodon discus Heckel, 1840

Species
- See text

= Discus (fish) =

Symphysodon

Genus of fishes

Symphysodon (colloquially known as discus or discus fish) is a genus of cichlids native to the Amazon river basin in Brazil. Due to their distinctive shape, calm behavior, many bright colors and patterns, and dedicated parenting techniques, discus are popular as freshwater aquarium fish, and their aquaculture in several countries in Asia (notably Thailand) is a major industry. They are sometimes referred to as pompadour fish. The discus fish has attracted a cult following of collectors and has created a multimillion dollar international industry complete with shows, competitions, and reputable online breeders.

== Etymology ==
The genus name "symphysodon", which was coined in 1840 by Johann Jakob Heckel, refers to the unusual symphysis of the teeth (-odon from Greek ὀδών, tooth).

== Species ==
Following a review published in 2006, three species are recognized by FishBase:

Image	Name	Distribution
	Symphysodon aequifasciatus Pellegrin, 1904 (blue discus or brown discus)	central Amazon Basin
	Symphysodon discus Heckel, 1840 (red discus or Heckel discus)	Amazon Basin
	Symphysodon tarzoo E. Lyons, 1959 (green discus)	western Amazon Basin

== Taxonomy ==
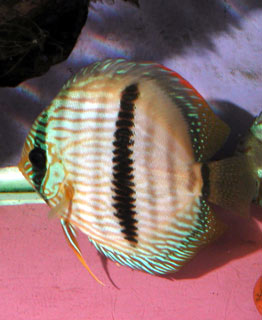
Symphysodon discus

Discus are fish from the genus Symphysodon, which currently includes the species S. aequifasciatus, S. discus and S. tarzoo, based on a taxonomic review published in 2006. A review published in 2007 largely came to the same result, but differed in nomenclature, as the species called S. tarzoo in the 2006 study was called S. aequifasciatus in the 2007 study, and S. aequifasciatus in 2006 was S. haraldi in 2007. Further arguments have been made that S. tarzoo was not described in accordance with ICZN rules and thus should be considered invalid and replaced with S. haraldi, currently considered a synonym of S. aequifasciatus by FishBase.

Other species and subspecies have been proposed, but morphometric data (unlike in Pterophyllum, the freshwater angelfish) varies as much between individuals from one location as across the whole range of all discus fish species. S. tarzoo was described in 1959 and applies to the red-spotted western population. S. aequifasciatus and S. discus, meanwhile, seem to hybridise frequently in the wild or have diverged recently, as they lack mitochondrial DNA lineage sorting but differ in color pattern and have dissimilar chromosomal translocation patterns. S. discus occurs mainly in the Rio Negro. Whether S. haraldi is indeed distinct from S. aequifasciatus remains to be determined; if valid it is widespread but it might just be a color morph.

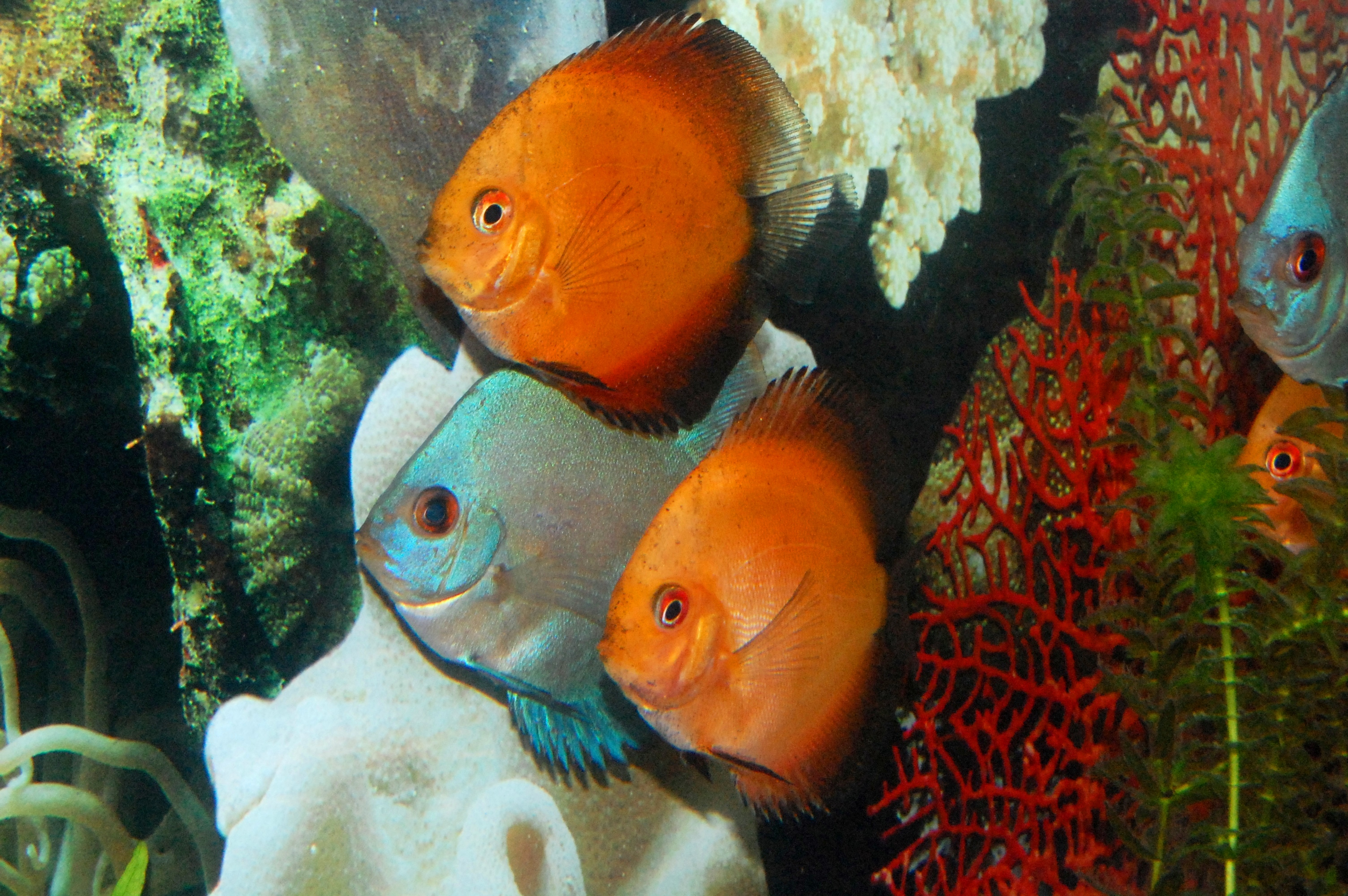
Two captive variants (orange and solid turquoise)

A molecular study in 2011 found five main groups, which generally matched previously recognized phenotypes. They recognized them as evolutionarily significant units and species. Their assigning of scientific names to species differed to some extent from that used by earlier authors: Heckel (S. discus; Rio Negro, upper Uatumã, Nhamundá, Trombetas and Abacaxis), green (S. tarzoo; West Amazon drainages upriver from the Purus Arch, blue (S. sp. 1; central Amazon from Purus Arch to the Meeting of Waters), brown (S. aequifasciatus; East Amazon downriver from Meeting of Waters), Xingu group (S. sp. 2; Xingu and Tocantins). The Xingu group currently lacks a scientific name, but it is possible that the correct name for the blue is S. haraldi. This taxonomy with four described valid species, S. discus, S. tarzoo, S. haraldi and S. aequifasciatus, has been adopted by the Catalog of Fishes. Some hybridisation occurs (or has occurred) between the brown discus and neighbouring forms, but overall they maintain their separate evolutionary trajectories.

In addition to the wild discus, several captive variants achieved by selective breeding exist. Based on RAPD sequences, the captive variants popularly known as turquoise, pigeon, ghost, cobalt and solid red are derived from wild green, blue and brown discus (not Heckel discus).

== Description ==
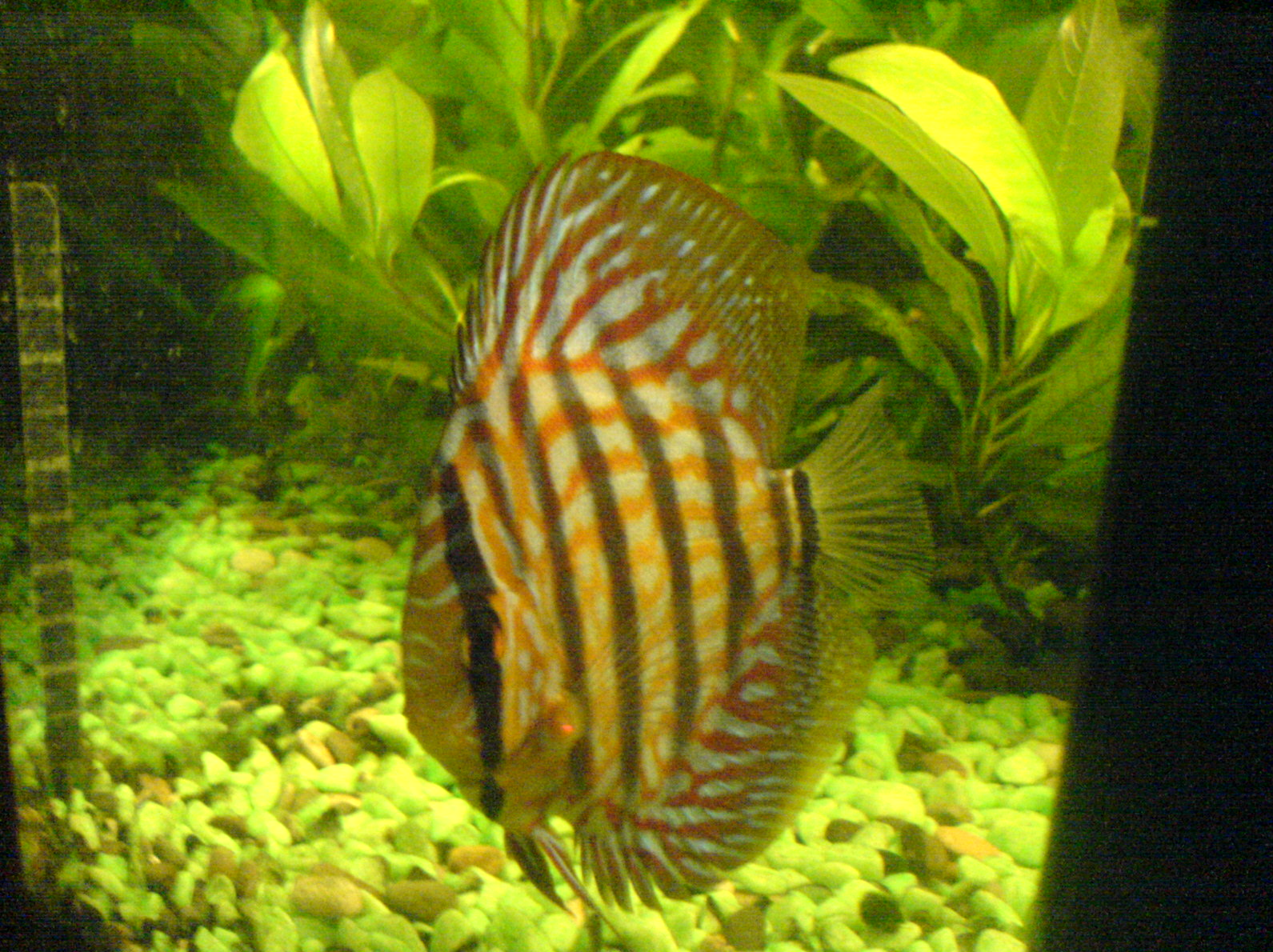
Red turquoise discus

Like cichlids from the genus Pterophyllum (angelfish), all Symphysodon species have a laterally compressed body shape. In contrast to Pterophyllum, however, extended finnage is absent giving Symphysodon a more rounded shape. It is this body shape from which their common name, "discus", is derived. The sides of the fish are frequently patterned in shades of green, red, brown, and blue. Some of the more brightly marked variants are the result of selective breeding by aquarists and do not exist in the wild. Discus typically reach up to 12.3–15.2 cm (4.8–6.0 in) in length, but captives have been claimed to reach 23 cm (9 in). Adults generally weigh 150–250 g (5.3–8.8 oz). Discus fish exhibit no sexual dimorphism when they are under about 4 inches in size, making it difficult to distinguish between males and females at a young age. Once they reach this size, the shape of their dorsal fins begins to change, with females retaining rounder dorsal fins and males developing more pointed ones. Other subtle indicators of sex include the overall size, as males are usually larger, and the thickness of their lips, with males often having thicker lips used for fighting. Despite these clues, none of these characteristics are guaranteed indicators of sex. The only definitive way to confirm the sex of discus fish is by observing spawning behavior, where a female lays eggs and a male swims over to fertilize them.

== Behavior ==
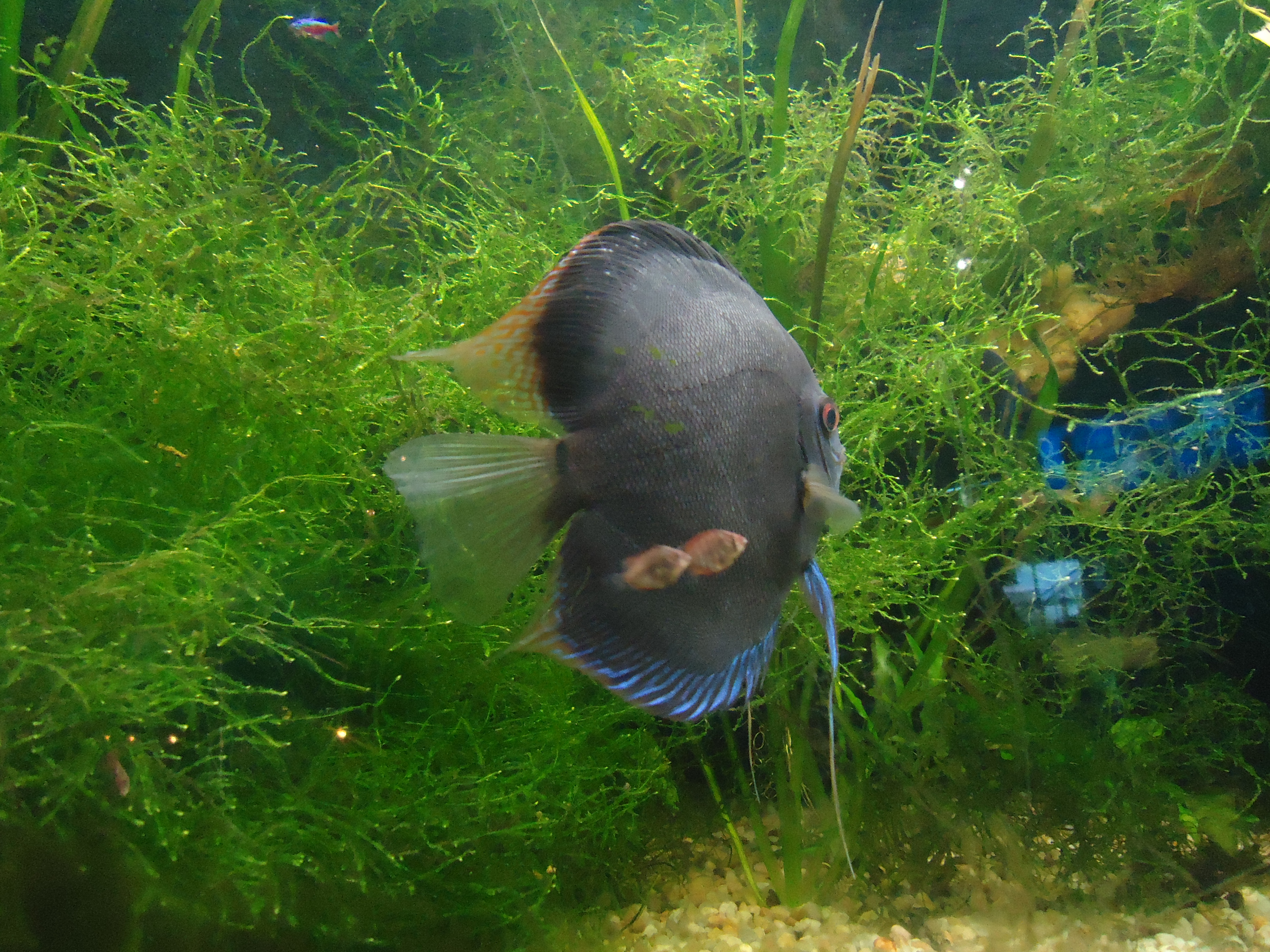
Discus with two of its young nearby

Symphysodon spp. are highly social, typically occurring in groups that may number many dozens of individuals, which is unique among cichlids of the Americas. When breeding, the pair moves away from the group, possibly to reduce the risk of cannibalism of the young. As with most cichlids, brood care is highly developed with both the parents caring for the young. Additionally, adult discus produce a secretion ("discus milk") through their skin, on which the larvae live during their first 4 weeks. During the first two weeks, the parents stay near their young allowing them to feed easily. In the last 2 weeks, they swim away, resulting in the young being gradually "weaned off" and starting to fend for themselves. Although rare in fish, more than 30 species of cichlids are known to feed their young with skin secretion to various extent, including Pseudetroplus and Uaru species. Sexual maturity is reached in a year.

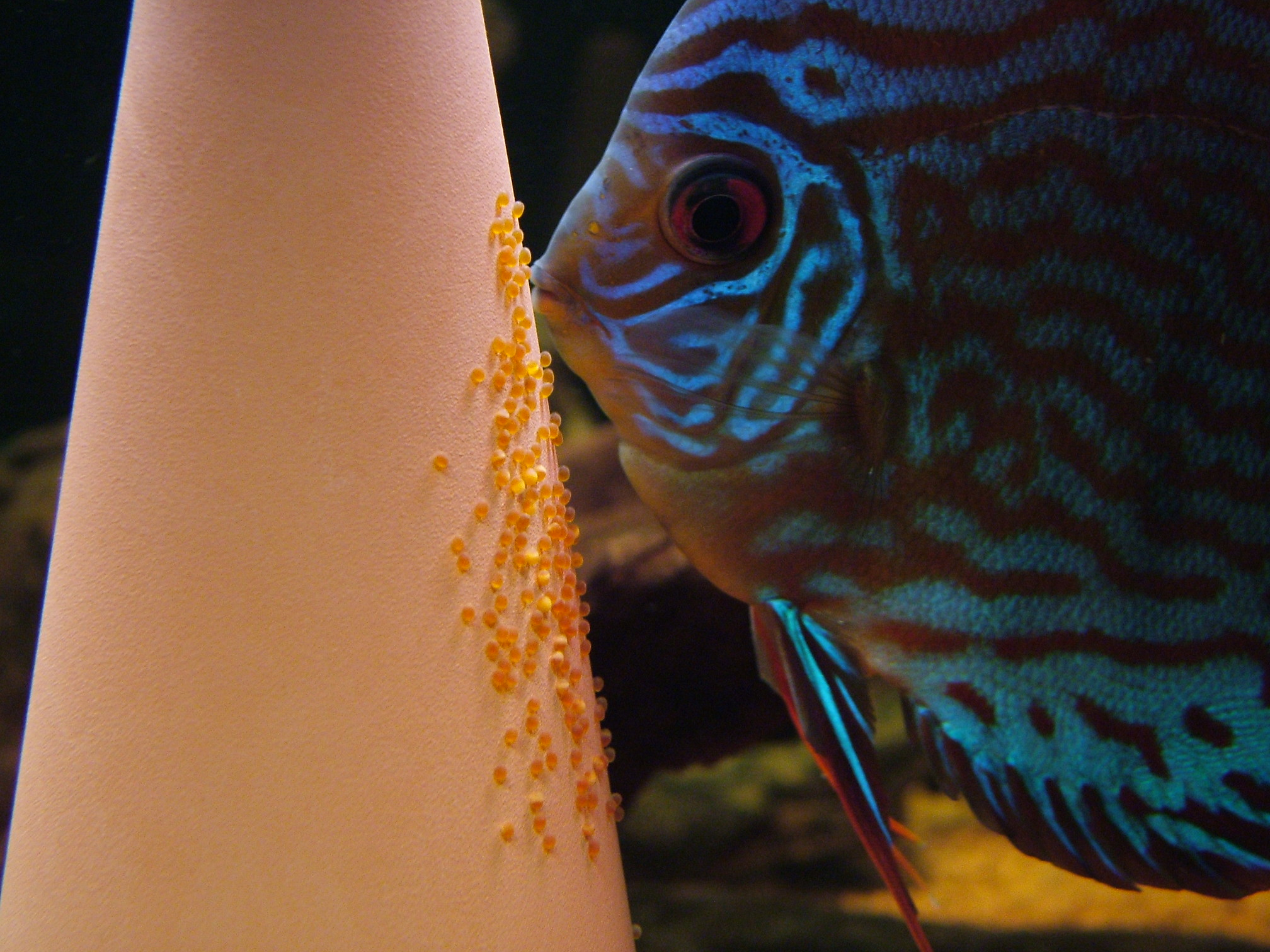
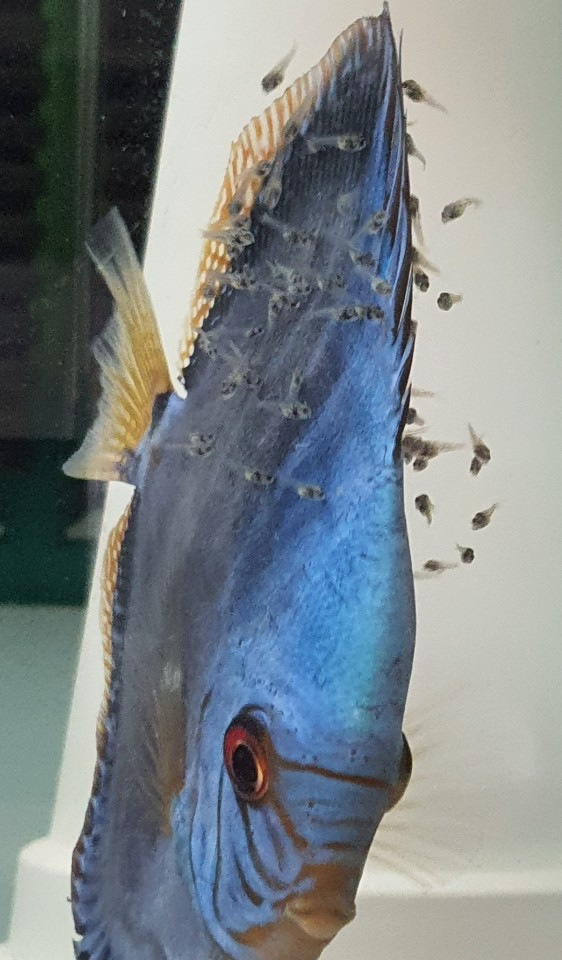
Eggs (left) and young feeding on parent's mucus (right)

Research has shown that, through this unique parental care behaviour (discus parents feeding their progeny with skin mucus), discus fish parents transmit key microorganisms to their fry. This parent-to-offspring transmission of important microorganisms might explain the high survival rate of discus fry raised with their parents, compared to the low survival rate of progeny raised artificially by fish breeders (e.g. on egg yolk, brine shrimp, or other replacement foods).

Symphysodon spp. primarily feed on algae, other plant material, and detritus (periphyton), but also eat small invertebrates. Invertebrates can make up 38% of the stomach content in wild S. aequifasciatus during the high-water season, but this decreases during the low-water season, and year-round it is generally lower in the other species. Unlike more predatory cichlids, Symphysodon spp. have relatively long intestines typical of a herbivore or omnivore.

== Distribution and habitat ==
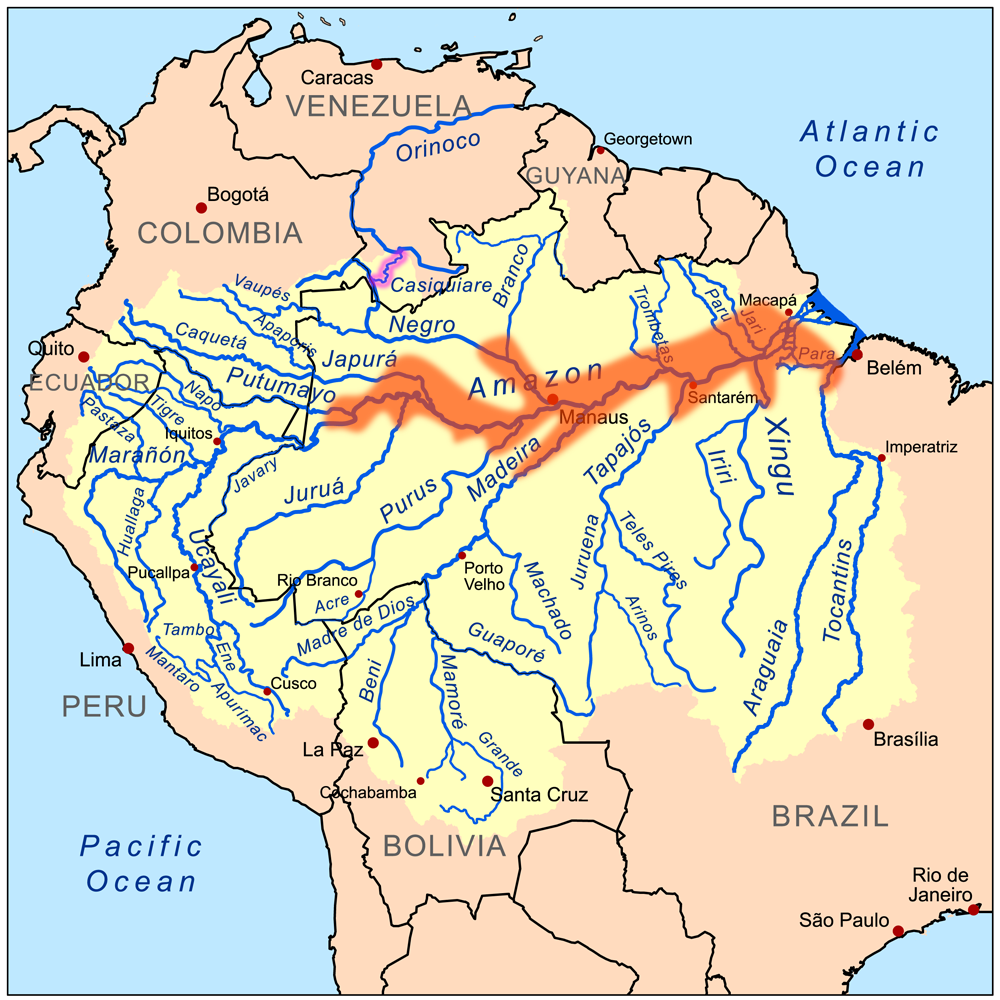
A map of the range (orange shading) of Symphysodon

Symphysodon species inhabit the margins of floodplain lakes and rivers in the lowland Amazon basin, where they are part of the highly diverse Neotropical fish fauna. S. discus is restricted to blackwater habitats, but periodically these may experience brief floods of whitewater. S. tarzoo is found in both black and whitewater, and S. aequifasciatus also occurs in clearwater. Because of their preference for lentic habitats such as floodplains and flooded forests, whitewater inhabited by discus contains little suspended material (unlike main sections of whitewater rivers).

The three species of Symphysodon have different geographic distributions. S. aequifasciatus occurs in the East Amazon downriver from the Purus Arch and S. tarzoo in the West Amazon upriver from the Purus Arch. In contrast, the distribution of S. discus appears to be limited to the lower reaches of the Rio Negro, upper Uatumã, Nhamundá, Trombetas, and Abacaxis Rivers.

The Nanay River in far western Amazonas is outside the native range; discus in this river were introduced from stock originating in the Tefé area by an aquarium exporter more than 30 years ago.

A significant number of discus now live in fish farms in Southeast Asia. These discus go to home aquaria around the world.

== Water quality and pH requirements ==
Discus fish are highly sensitive to water chemistry, with their ideal potential of hydrogen (pH) requirements heavily dependent on whether the individuals are captive-bred or wild-caught. Historically, wild specimens are native to the soft, highly acidic blackwater tributaries of the Amazon basin, where pH values frequently range between 5.0 and 6.0. In contrast, the vast majority of discus commercially available in the modern aquarium hobby are captive-bred strains. These domesticated fish exhibit significantly higher environmental plasticity and can be safely maintained in more neutral water chemistry, typically between 6.0 and 7.0 pH, though they can adapt to values as high as 7.5 provided the parameters remain stable.

Water stability is considered far more critical to the long-term health of the fish than achieving a specific numerical target, as rapid pH fluctuations can induce severe physiological stress, compromise the immune system, or lead to acute alkalosis or acidosis. During the reproductive and early life stages, water parameters must be tightly regulated. Research into the embryonic and larval development of the blue discus (Symphysodon aequifasciatus) indicates that a stable pH range between 6.3 and 6.6 is optimal for minimizing developmental stress and preventing skeletal deformities during the incubation period.

Additionally, chronic environmental stress or chemical imbalances—such as improper pH management combined with dietary calcium and phosphorus deficiencies—have been investigated as contributing environmental factors in the progression of systemic illnesses like Hole-in-the-head disease (HITH).

== Home aquarium ==
Discus are kept by fishkeepers in the home aquarium, where they are valued for their striking appearance. They are considered difficult to keep, due to strict requirements for water quality and the need to be kept in groups. Breeders have selected for individuals with more adaptability to tap water conditions.

In home aquariums, discus live for an average of 10 years, but can live up to 15 years, and can grow up to 8 inches. Like many fish in the home aquarium, they will eat almost anything that fits within their mouth. Due to their size, they often require a minimum 55 US gal (210 L) – 75 US gal (280 L) aquarium.

Each year the World Discus Competition takes place in Guangzhou, China. The North American Discus Association focuses on both supporting hobbyists and helping to support wild discus.

== See also ==
- List of freshwater aquarium fish species
- Project Piaba
