= Amazonian pop art =

Art movement originating in Peru

Amazonian pop art (also known as Amazon pop art or wild naive) is a contemporary art movement that emerged in late 1990 in Iquitos. The movement has an intense chromaticism with a great representation of ayahuasca experience psychedelic —a delirious artistic style that is seen strongly in the non-Amazonian pop art works of Pablo Amaringo. Originally, it is a mural art that blends prominently the colorful amazonian culture, European motifs and commercial characters, which could be influenced by American pop art when the era of cable television came to the city, like MTV.

== Background ==
Amazonian pop art grew self-taught. Mainly started in the suburbs of Iquitos, where there was no art market, or some kind of art school, because that too is considered a naive style. Essentially, the Amazonian pop art originated from various mixes of popular culture Iquitos received through the media, including movie posters, typography of film in Mexico and India. Another important feature is the visual style that originated from music videos. Typically, in most of the Amazonian pop art works is denoted nightclubs, bars and pubs video scene. In several other compositions, it also becomes large presence of the feminine and the erotic.

== Classification ==
In the visual, Amazonian pop art is divided into two categories: the diurnal works have consistent and complete colors, and the nocturn works, the most attractive, are painted with phosphorescent material —often taking infinite forms as a collection of neon lights—, that glow under black light or simple night.

Currently, several artists engaged in decorating the rustic architecture of the city —such as huts and palafittes— in areas such as the Belen District as a method of artistic expression and cultural influence. The cultural impact of art was so attractive that comes up in cemeteries.

== Notable artists ==
- Piero
- Ashuco
- Lu.cu.ma
- Luis Sakiray
- Christian Bendayán
