= Peperomia ventricosicarpa =

Scientific classification
- Kingdom: Plantae
- Clade: Embryophytes
- Clade: Tracheophytes
- Clade: Angiosperms
- Clade: Magnoliids
- Order: Piperales
- Family: Piperaceae
- Genus: Peperomia
- Species: P. ventricosicarpa

Binomial name
- Peperomia ventricosicarpa Trel.

Species of plant

Peperomia ventricosicarpa is a species of plant from the genus Peperomia. It was described by William Trelease in 1936 and published in the book "Publication. Field Museum of Natural History Botanical series".

== Etymology ==
Ventricosicarpa comes from the word "ventricose". Ventricose is defined as swollen or inflated on one side.

== Distribution ==
Peperomia ventricosicarpa is endemic to Peru.

- Peru
  - Loreto
    - Itaya River
