= Lake Zungarococha =

Lake in Peru

- Location within Peru
- Location: Loreto Region, Maynas Province, San Juan Bautista District
- Coordinates: 3°49′22″S 73°21′37″W
- Basin countries: Peru

Lake Zungarococha (possibly from Quechua sunkaru a South American cat fish, qucha lake) is a lake in Peru. It lies near the Nanay River, southwest of Iquitos, in the Loreto Region, Maynas Province, San Juan Bautista District.

== See also ==
- List of lakes in Peru
