= Refugio Altiplano =

Shamanic healing retreat in the Peruvian Amazon

Refugio Altiplano is a shamanic healing retreat in the Peruvian Amazon that specializes in ayahuasca ceremonies. Founded in 1996, it is one of the first ayahuasca retreats in Latin America to focus mainly on international clients. The retreat center is set on a 700-acre rainforest reserve adjacent to the Tamshiyacu River, a tributary of the Amazon River, and is reachable only by boat from Iquitos, Peru.

== History ==
Refugio Altiplano was founded by Scott Peterson, an American who completed a six-year apprenticeship with a Shipibo shaman near Pucallpa, Peru. The retreat was opened in 1996 with the goal of making ayahuasca healing available to more individuals outside of Peru. Peterson led the retreat until his death in 2013, when it continued to operate under new management.

The retreat habitually has Shipibo shamans on its staff, due to the tribe's centuries-old cultural and spiritual connection with ayahuasca. It has drawn travelers from several nations over the years and has been highlighted in books, documentaries, and media reports on ayahuasca tourism and traditional Amazonian plant medicine.

== Programs ==
Refugio Altiplano provides residential programs of ayahuasca ceremonies, which are always conducted by skilled shamans. The programs cover accommodation, meals, and supervised attendance of the ceremonies. The retreat also offers space for guests to explore other Amazonian plant medicine practices, subject to availability and practitioner proficiency.

== Notable media coverage ==
Refugio Altiplano has been covered in media and cultural productions, such as the non-fiction book, The Ayahuasca Diaries by Caspar Greeff, which took place mostly at the retreat. The retreat was featured in video productions by YouTube Originals, such as a documentary that gained several million views online.

The center was visited by psychedelic researcher Robin Carhart-Harris, who gave a talk about ayahuasca and shamanic practices during his visit. The retreat was also profiled in The Lost Executive, The Daily Telegraph, and News.com.au in the context of ayahuasca tourism and alternative medicine.

== See also ==
- Shamanism
- Regional forms of shamanism
- Shamanic music
- Ayahuasca
