= Las amazonas =

Las amazonas may refer to:

- War Goddess, a 1973 adventure film, known in Spain as Las amazonas
- Las amazonas (Venezuelan TV series), 1985
- Las amazonas (Mexican TV series), 2016
- Las Amazonas District, Maynas Province, Peru
