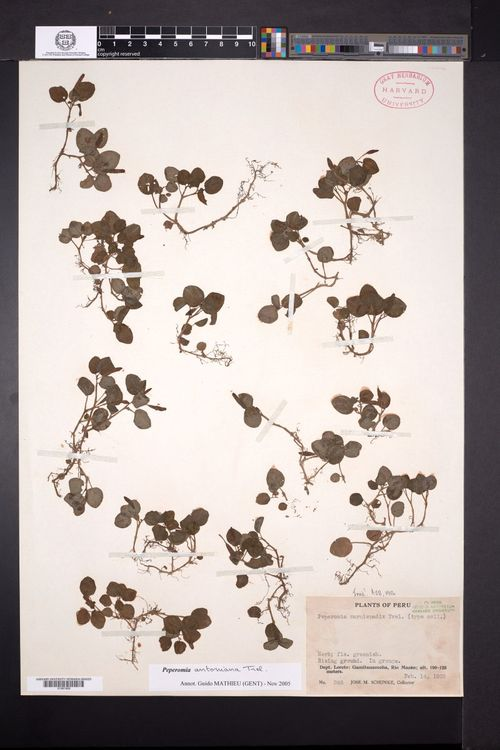

Scientific classification
- Kingdom: Plantae
- Clade: Tracheophytes
- Clade: Angiosperms
- Clade: Magnoliids
- Order: Piperales
- Family: Piperaceae
- Genus: Peperomia
- Species: P. antoniana

Binomial name
- Peperomia antoniana Trel.

= Peperomia antoniana =

Species of flowering plant

Peperomia antoniana is a species of epiphyte in the genus Peperomia that is endemic in Peru. It grows on wet tropical biomes. Its conservation status is Threatened.

== Description ==
The type specimen were collected near Río Itaya, Peru at an altitude of 110 meters (360 ft).

Peperomia antoniana is a small, creeping terrestrial herb with a smooth, hairless surface. Its leaves are arranged alternately and are rounded-ovate in shape with a very blunt tip and a heart-shaped base. Each leaf measures 15 to 20 mm (0.59 to 0.79 in) in both length and width, featuring five prominent nerves. When dried, the leaves remain green and translucent. The petioles range from 5 to 20 mm in length. The flower spikes are thread-like when dried, measuring 10 to 15 mm long and 3 mm thick. The floral bracts are rounded and peltate, shield-shaped with the peduncle attached to the center.

== Taxonomy and naming ==
It was described in 1936 by William Trelease in Publications of the Field Museum of Natural History, Botanical Series 13, from specimens collected by Ellsworth Paine Killip & Dorothea Eliza Smith. It got its name from the location where the type specimen was collected.

== Distribution and habitat ==
It is endemic in Peru. It grows on a epiphyte environment and is a herb. It grows on wet tropical biomes.

== Conservation ==
This species is assessed as Threatened, in a preliminary report.
