= Indiana District =

The Indiana District may refer to:

- Indiana District of the Lutheran Church – Missouri Synod, an administrative subdivision of that denomination
- Indiana District, Maynas, a district (political subdivision) of Peru
