= San Juan Bautista District, Maynas =

Coordinates: 3.7749°S 73.2988°W

San Juan Bautista District
- District
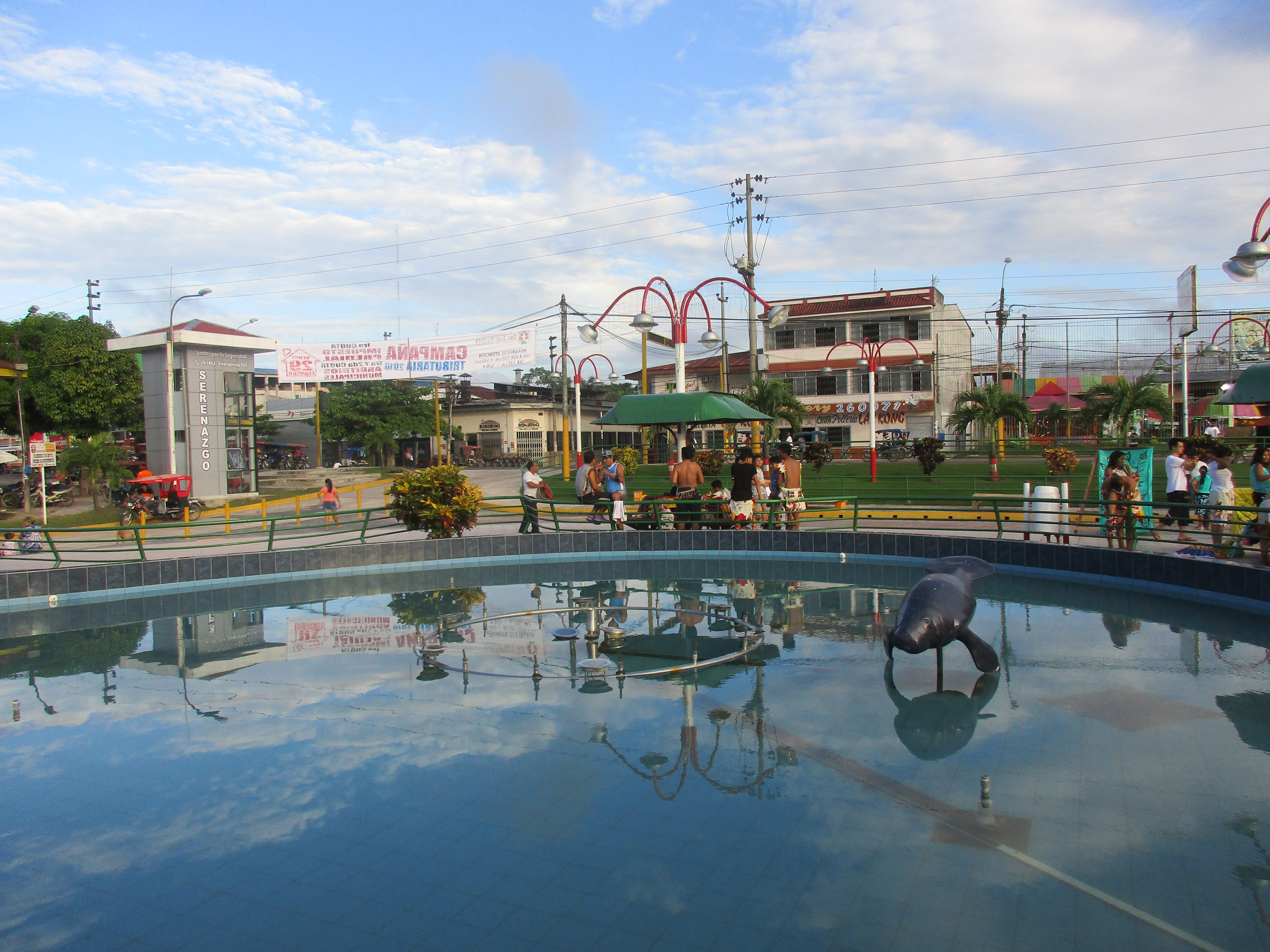
- San Juan Bautista District

- Coat of arms
- Interactive map of San Juan Bautista District
- Country: Peru
- Region: Loreto
- Province: Maynas
- Founded: November 5, 1999
- Capital: San Juan

Government
  - Mayor: Mirna Villacorta Cardenas

Area
  - Total: 3,117.05 km^{2} (1,203.50 sq mi)
- Elevation: 138 m (453 ft)

Population (2007 census)
  - Total: 124,100
  - Density: 39.81/km^{2} (103.1/sq mi)
- Time zone: UTC-5 (PET)
- UBIGEO: 160113

San Juan Bautista District is one of thirteen districts of the Maynas Province in Peru.

== Climate ==
Climate data for Moralillo, San Juan Bautista, elevation 106 m (348 ft), (1991–2020)
Month	Jan	Feb	Mar	Apr	May	Jun	Jul	Aug	Sep	Oct	Nov	Dec	Year
Mean daily maximum °C (°F)	32.1 (89.8)	32.3 (90.1)	32.0 (89.6)	31.8 (89.2)	31.3 (88.3)	31.0 (87.8)	31.3 (88.3)	32.7 (90.9)	33.3 (91.9)	33.1 (91.6)	32.7 (90.9)	32.2 (90.0)	32.2 (89.9)
Mean daily minimum °C (°F)	21.7 (71.1)	21.9 (71.4)	21.7 (71.1)	21.8 (71.2)	21.5 (70.7)	20.9 (69.6)	20.4 (68.7)	20.5 (68.9)	20.9 (69.6)	21.5 (70.7)	21.8 (71.2)	21.8 (71.2)	21.4 (70.5)
Average precipitation mm (inches)	262.0 (10.31)	210.5 (8.29)	331.2 (13.04)	260.8 (10.27)	228.1 (8.98)	166.0 (6.54)	153.5 (6.04)	160.0 (6.30)	172.9 (6.81)	213.8 (8.42)	202.3 (7.96)	267.5 (10.53)	2,628.6 (103.49)
Source: National Meteorology and Hydrology Service of Peru

Climate data for Puerto Almendra, San Juan Bautista, elevation 96 m (315 ft), (1991–2020)
Month	Jan	Feb	Mar	Apr	May	Jun	Jul	Aug	Sep	Oct	Nov	Dec	Year
Mean daily maximum °C (°F)	31.4 (88.5)	31.4 (88.5)	31.3 (88.3)	31.1 (88.0)	30.7 (87.3)	30.5 (86.9)	30.6 (87.1)	31.8 (89.2)	32.3 (90.1)	32.2 (90.0)	31.8 (89.2)	31.4 (88.5)	31.4 (88.5)
Mean daily minimum °C (°F)	22.8 (73.0)	22.8 (73.0)	22.9 (73.2)	22.9 (73.2)	22.7 (72.9)	22.2 (72.0)	21.4 (70.5)	21.6 (70.9)	22.1 (71.8)	22.5 (72.5)	22.8 (73.0)	22.8 (73.0)	22.5 (72.4)
Average precipitation mm (inches)	224.6 (8.84)	198.2 (7.80)	284.2 (11.19)	249.4 (9.82)	236.9 (9.33)	161.3 (6.35)	131.8 (5.19)	117.8 (4.64)	145.1 (5.71)	173.1 (6.81)	198.1 (7.80)	252.5 (9.94)	2,373 (93.42)
Source: National Meteorology and Hydrology Service of Peru

Climate data for San Roque, San Juan Bautista, elevation 106 m (348 ft), (1991–2020)
Month	Jan	Feb	Mar	Apr	May	Jun	Jul	Aug	Sep	Oct	Nov	Dec	Year
Mean daily maximum °C (°F)	32.4 (90.3)	32.3 (90.1)	32.1 (89.8)	31.8 (89.2)	31.5 (88.7)	31.1 (88.0)	31.2 (88.2)	32.3 (90.1)	32.8 (91.0)	33.0 (91.4)	32.6 (90.7)	32.2 (90.0)	32.1 (89.8)
Mean daily minimum °C (°F)	22.7 (72.9)	22.6 (72.7)	22.7 (72.9)	22.7 (72.9)	22.6 (72.7)	22.1 (71.8)	21.5 (70.7)	21.7 (71.1)	22.1 (71.8)	22.6 (72.7)	22.7 (72.9)	22.8 (73.0)	22.4 (72.3)
Average precipitation mm (inches)	245.2 (9.65)	232.2 (9.14)	284.7 (11.21)	254.5 (10.02)	248.2 (9.77)	162.7 (6.41)	132.3 (5.21)	159.1 (6.26)	160.6 (6.32)	198.4 (7.81)	192.0 (7.56)	236.5 (9.31)	2,506.4 (98.67)
Source: National Meteorology and Hydrology Service of Peru

== See also ==
- Sunkaruqucha
