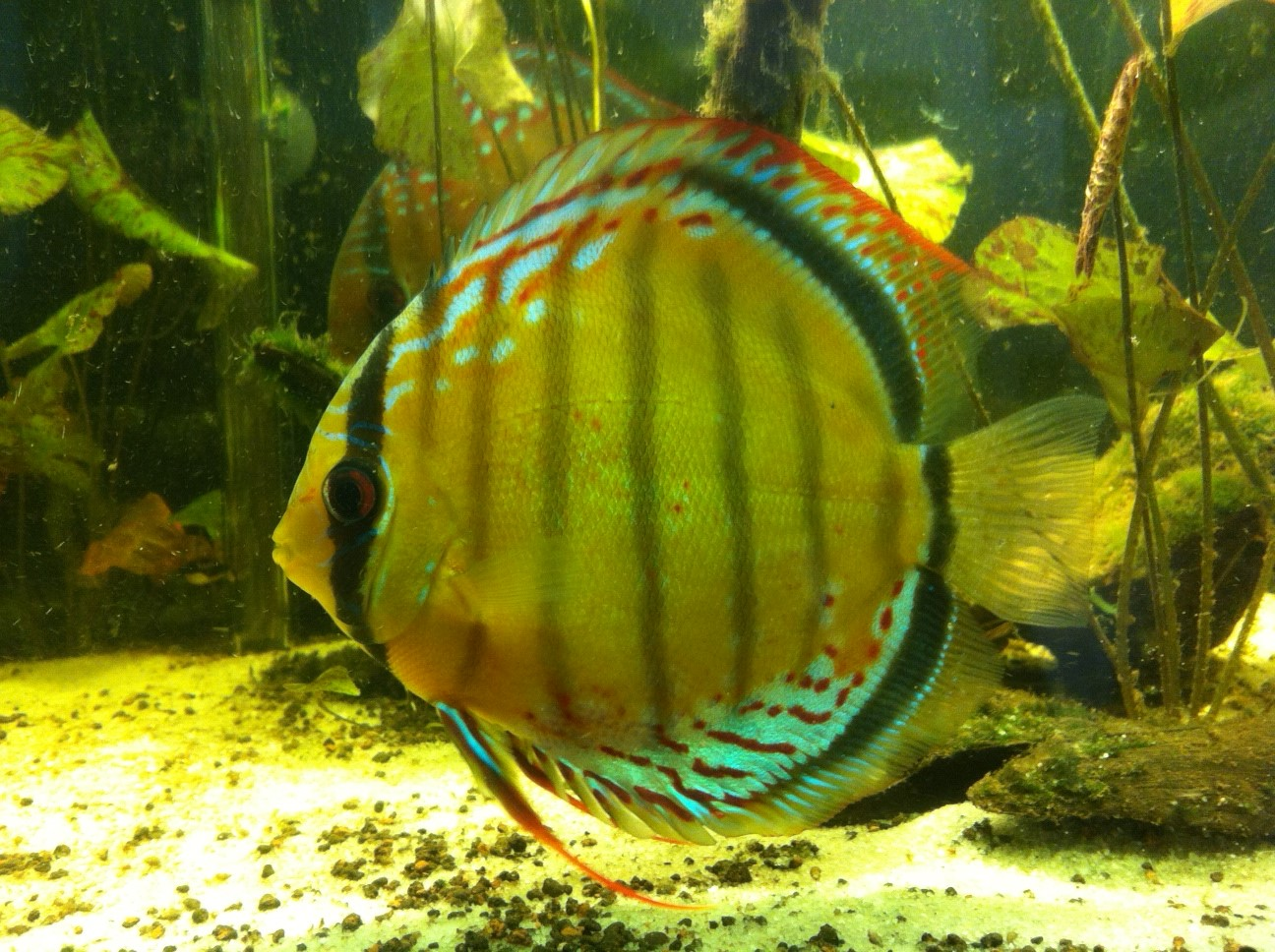

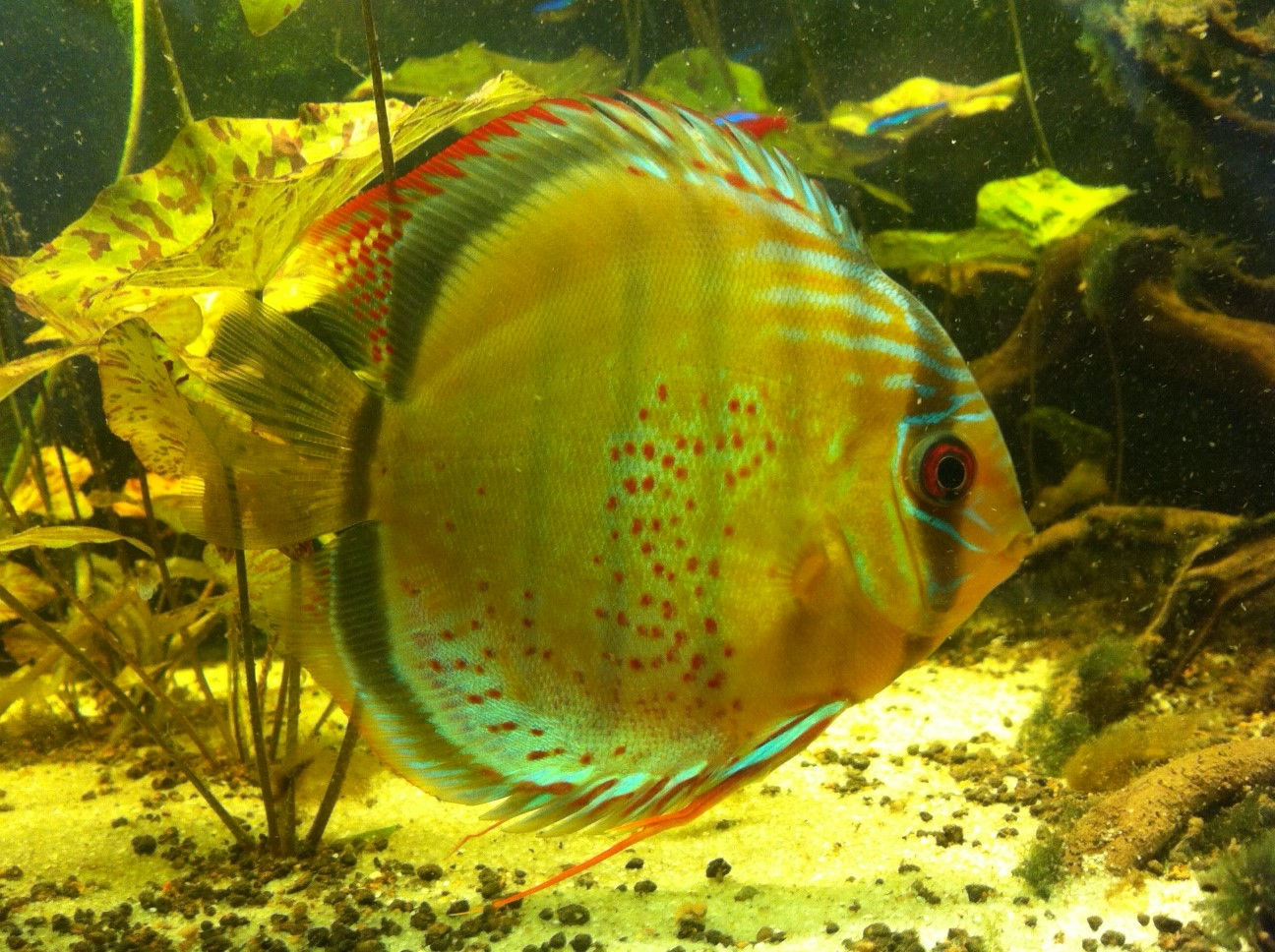
- Individuals from Nanay (above) and Japurá Rivers (below)

Conservation status
- Least Concern (IUCN 3.1)

Scientific classification
- Kingdom: Animalia
- Phylum: Chordata
- Class: Actinopterygii
- Order: Cichliformes
- Family: Cichlidae
- Genus: Symphysodon
- Species: S. tarzoo

Binomial name
- Symphysodon tarzoo Lyons, 1959

= Symphysodon tarzoo =

Green discus

Species of fish

Symphysodon tarzoo, the green discus, is a species of cichlid endemic to Brazil; specifically, to rivers of the western Amazon Basin upriver from the Purus arch, although it occasionally occurs downstream. An introduced population in the Nanay River is based on stock from the Tefé region. The green discus is found in blackwater habitats with a high temperature of 27–30 °C (81–86 °F) and low pH of 4.8–5.9. Although also known from whitewater, its preference for lentic habitats such as floodplains means that the water contain little suspended material (unlike main sections of whitewater rivers).

This species grows to a length of 13.2 centimetres (5.2 in) SL. S. tarzoo has red spots on the anal fin and body, which separates it from other discus species.

The scientific name was coined by Earl Lyons in 1959, and the species was revalidated by pattern, morphology and mtDNA in 2006. Later studies have confirmed its distinction, although some suggest the correct scientific name for the green discus is S. aequifasciatus (a name typically used for the blue/brown discus). No natural (wild) hybrids are known between the green discus and its relatives.
