= Amazon Basin (sedimentary basin) =

Sedimentary basin

- Bacia do Amazonas
- Location within Brazil

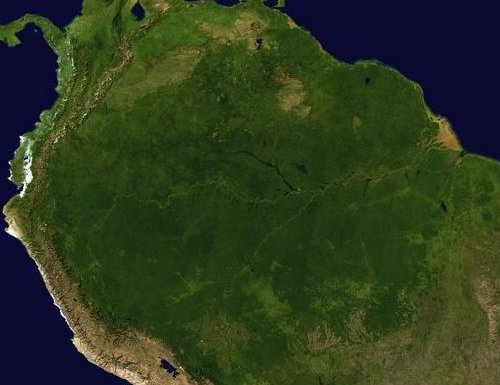
- The basin is located in the center and center-right of the picture.
- Coordinates: 2°29′47″S 57°3′25″W
- Etymology: Amazon River
- Location: South America
- Region: North
- Country: Brazil
- States: Amazonas, Pará
- Cities: Manaus

Characteristics
- On/Offshore: Onshore
- Boundaries: Guiana Shield, Gurupá Arch; Marajó Basin, Brazilian Shield, Púrus Arch; Solimões Basin
- Part of: Amazon basins
- Area: 620,000 km^{2} (240,000 sq mi)

Hydrology
- River: Amazon River

Geology
- Basin type: Continental rift basin
- Plate: South America
- Age: Cambrian-recent

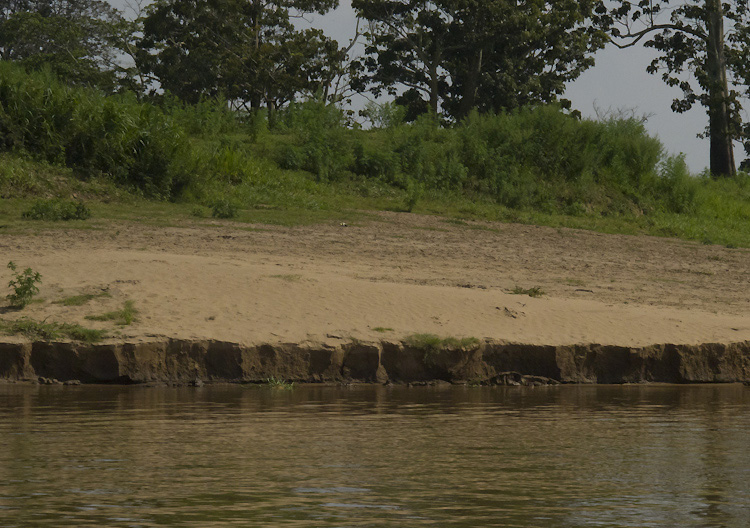
Amazon alluvium deposit

The Amazon Basin is a large sedimentary basin (620,000 square kilometres (240,000 sq mi)) located near the middle and lower course of the Amazon River, south the Guiana Shield and north of the Central Brazilian Shield. The basin developed on a rift that originated about 550 million years ago during the Cambrian.

== Location ==
The Amazon Basin is located south of the Guiana Shield, north of the Central Brazilian Shield, east of the Solimões Basin, and west of the Marajó Basin. It is bound to the west by the Púrus Arch and in the east by the Gurupá Arch. The basin has an elongated shape with a WSW-ENE orientation. Its long axis runs from the vicinity of Manaus to the area near the confluence of Xingu River with the Amazon River.

== Evolution of the basin ==
The Amazon Basin was developed on a rift, called the Sub-Amazonal Rift, that originated about 550 million years ago during continental collision of the West African Craton. Parts of the rift were reactivated during the opening of the South Atlantic. The Amazon Basin evolved through tectonic activity including continental collision, subduction, and distortion of parts of the Andes Mountain Range.

== Bauxite deposits ==
The Amazon basin hosts large deposits of the aluminum-rich sedimentary rock bauxite. The discovery of bauxite deposits approximately 70 years ago made Brazil one of the most important countries in terms of both production and possession of bauxite deposits.
