= Indiana, Peru =

Town in Peru

- Village
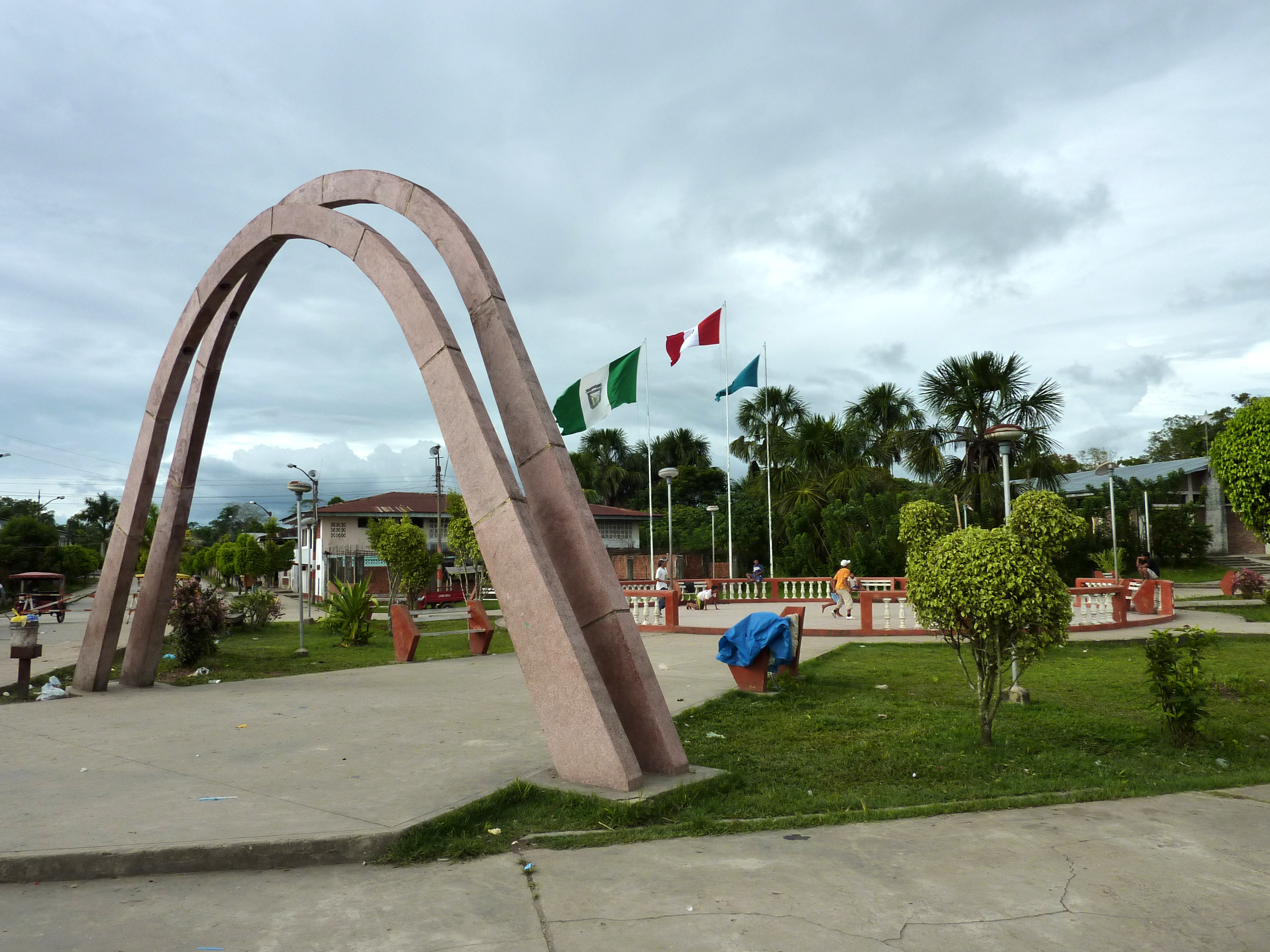
- Main plaza in Indiana

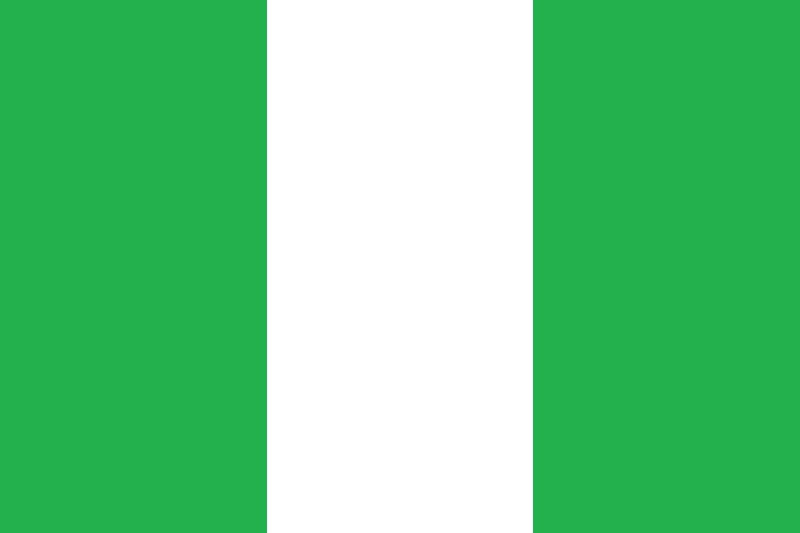
- Flag
- Interactive map of Indiana, Peru
- Coordinates: 3°30′S 73°2′W
- Country: Peru
- Region: Loreto
- Province: Maynas
- District: Indiana

Government
  - Mayor: Marlon Rengifo Crisostomo
- Elevation: 105 m (344 ft)

Population (2017)
  - Total: 10,134
- Time zone: UTC-5 (PET)
- Climate: Af

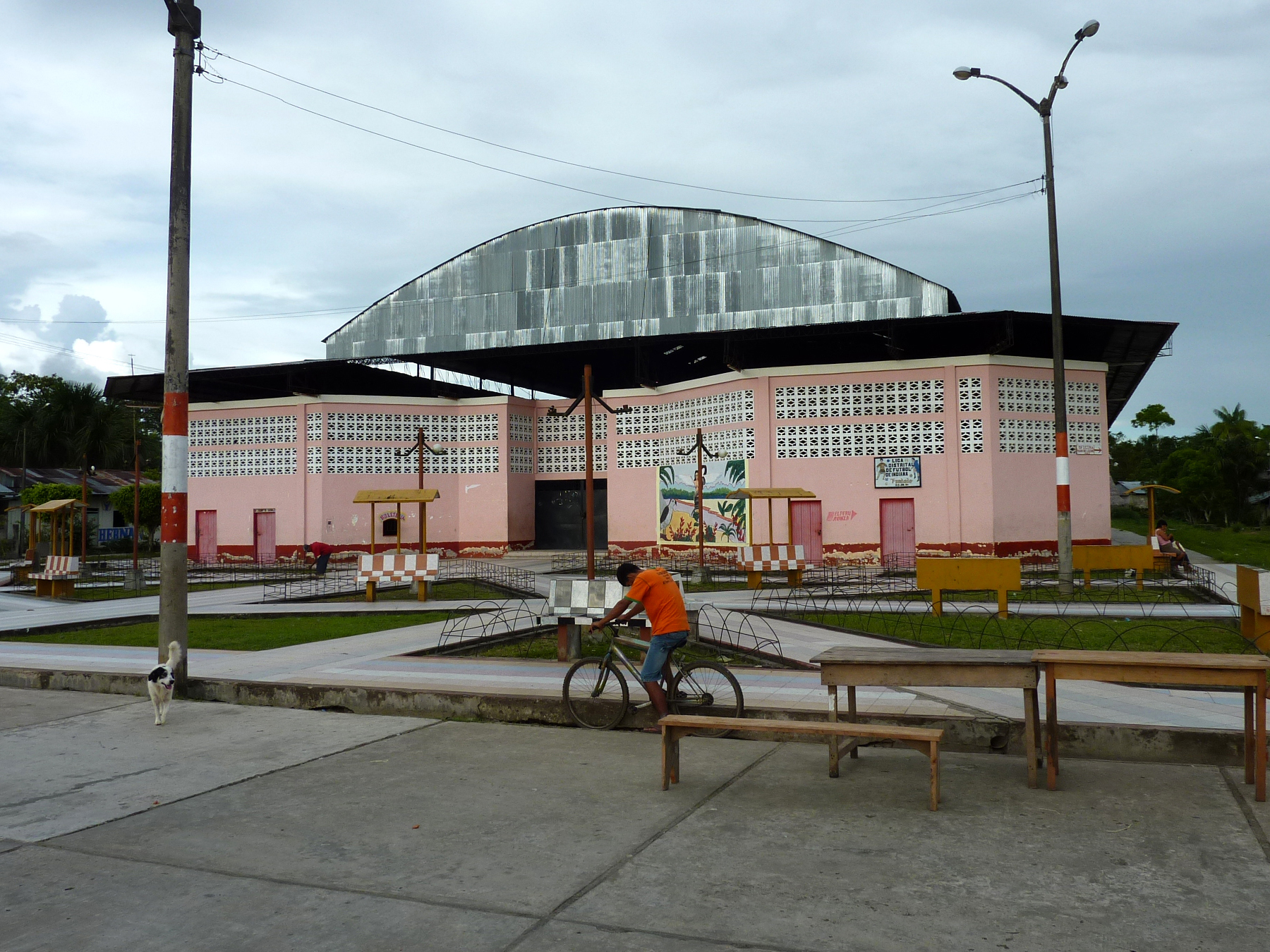
Arena in Indiana

Indiana is a town and the capital of the Indiana District in the Maynas Province of Peru. Located in Peru's northernmost Loreto Region, it is deep in the Amazon rainforest and sits on the Amazon River.
