= Alto Nanay District =

Coordinates: 3.6667°S 73.2850°W

Alto Nanay District Distrito de Alto Nanay
- District
- Interactive map of Alto Nanay District
- Country: Peru
- Region: Loreto
- Province: Maynas
- Founded: July 2, 1943
- Capital: Santa María de Nanay

Government
  - Mayor: Juan José Gaviria Piña

Area
  - Total: 14,290.8 km^{2} (5,517.7 sq mi)
- Elevation: 128 m (420 ft)

Population (2005 census)
  - Total: 2,826
  - Density: 0.1977/km^{2} (0.5122/sq mi)
- Time zone: UTC-5 (PET)
- UBIGEO: 160102

Alto Nanay District is one of thirteen districts of Maynas Province in Peru.
