= Indiana District, Maynas =

Coordinates: 3.5005°S 73.0577°W

Indiana District
- District
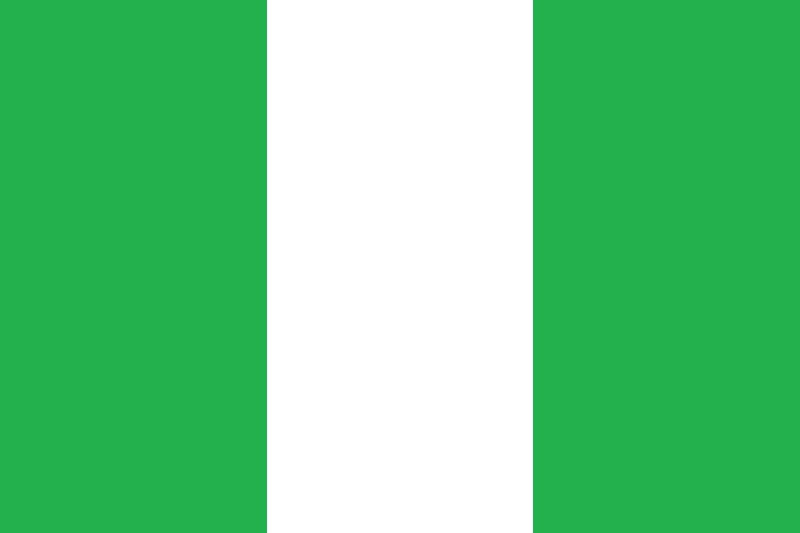
- Flag
- Interactive map of Indiana District
- Country: Peru
- Region: Loreto
- Province: Maynas
- Founded: December 21, 1961
- Capital: Indiana

Government
  - Mayor: Marlon Rengifo Crisostomo

Area
  - Total: 3,297.76 km^{2} (1,273.27 sq mi)
- Elevation: 105 m (344 ft)

Population (2017)
  - Total: 10,134
  - Density: 3.0730/km^{2} (7.9590/sq mi)
- Time zone: UTC-5 (PET)
- UBIGEO: 160104

Indiana District is one of thirteen districts of the Maynas Province in Peru.
