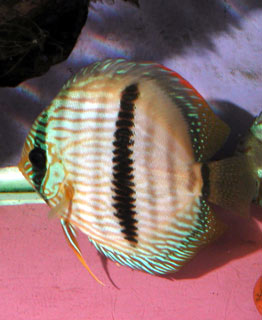

Conservation status
- Least Concern (IUCN 3.1)

Scientific classification
- Kingdom: Animalia
- Phylum: Chordata
- Class: Actinopterygii
- Order: Cichliformes
- Family: Cichlidae
- Genus: Symphysodon
- Species: S. discus

Binomial name
- Symphysodon discus Heckel, 1840

Synonyms
- Symphysodon discus willischwartzi W. E. Burgess, 1981

= Symphysodon discus =

Species of fish

Symphysodon discus, the red discus or Heckel discus, is a species of cichlid endemic to the Amazon Basin of Brazil, where found in the lower Rio Negro, upper Uatumã, Nhamundá, Trombetas and Abacaxis.

This species is essentially restricted to blackwater habitats with a high temperature of 26–32 °C (79–90 °F) and low pH of 4.2–5.2.

This species grows to a length of 20 centimetres (7.9 in) SL.

This species can also be found in the aquarium trade.

== Parental care ==
Small fry of this fish feed on the mucus secreted by their parents.
