= Fernando Lores District =

Coordinates: 4.0019°S 73.1628°W

Fernando Lores
- District
- Interactive map of Fernando Lores
- Country: Peru
- Region: Loreto
- Province: Maynas
- Founded: June 8, 1936
- Capital: Tamshiyacu

Government
  - Mayor: Josue Vasquez Rengifo

Area
  - Total: 4,476.19 km^{2} (1,728.27 sq mi)
- Elevation: 108 m (354 ft)

Population (2005 census)
  - Total: 20,759
  - Density: 4.6376/km^{2} (12.011/sq mi)
- Time zone: UTC-5 (PET)
- UBIGEO: 160103

Fernando Lores District is one of thirteen districts of the Maynas Province in Peru.

== Climate ==
Climate data for Tamshiyacu, Fernando Lores, elevation 94 m (308 ft), (1991–2020)
Month	Jan	Feb	Mar	Apr	May	Jun	Jul	Aug	Sep	Oct	Nov	Dec	Year
Mean daily maximum °C (°F)	31.6 (88.9)	31.5 (88.7)	31.3 (88.3)	30.8 (87.4)	30.5 (86.9)	30.2 (86.4)	30.4 (86.7)	31.6 (88.9)	32.2 (90.0)	32.4 (90.3)	32.3 (90.1)	31.8 (89.2)	31.4 (88.5)
Mean daily minimum °C (°F)	21.7 (71.1)	21.7 (71.1)	21.6 (70.9)	21.6 (70.9)	21.7 (71.1)	21.1 (70.0)	20.8 (69.4)	20.9 (69.6)	21.5 (70.7)	22.0 (71.6)	22.0 (71.6)	21.7 (71.1)	21.5 (70.8)
Average precipitation mm (inches)	262.3 (10.33)	270.7 (10.66)	298.4 (11.75)	287.4 (11.31)	275.4 (10.84)	189.2 (7.45)	165.3 (6.51)	154.0 (6.06)	158.5 (6.24)	222.3 (8.75)	229.3 (9.03)	275.9 (10.86)	2,788.7 (109.79)
Source: National Meteorology and Hydrology Service of Peru
