= Tigre District =

Coordinates: 3.5292°S 74.7300°W

Tigre
- District
- Interactive map of Tigre
- Country: Peru
- Region: Loreto
- Province: Loreto
- Founded: July 2, 1943
- Capital: Intutu

Government
  - Mayor: Valentin Yaicate Pizango

Area
  - Total: 19,785.7 km^{2} (7,639.3 sq mi)
- Elevation: 125 m (410 ft)

Population (2005 census)
  - Total: 7,616
  - Density: 0.3849/km^{2} (0.9969/sq mi)
- Time zone: UTC-5 (PET)
- UBIGEO: 160303

Tigre District is one of five districts of the province Loreto in Peru.

== Places of interest ==
- Pucacuro Reserved Zone
