= Itaya River =

Itaya River Río Itaya
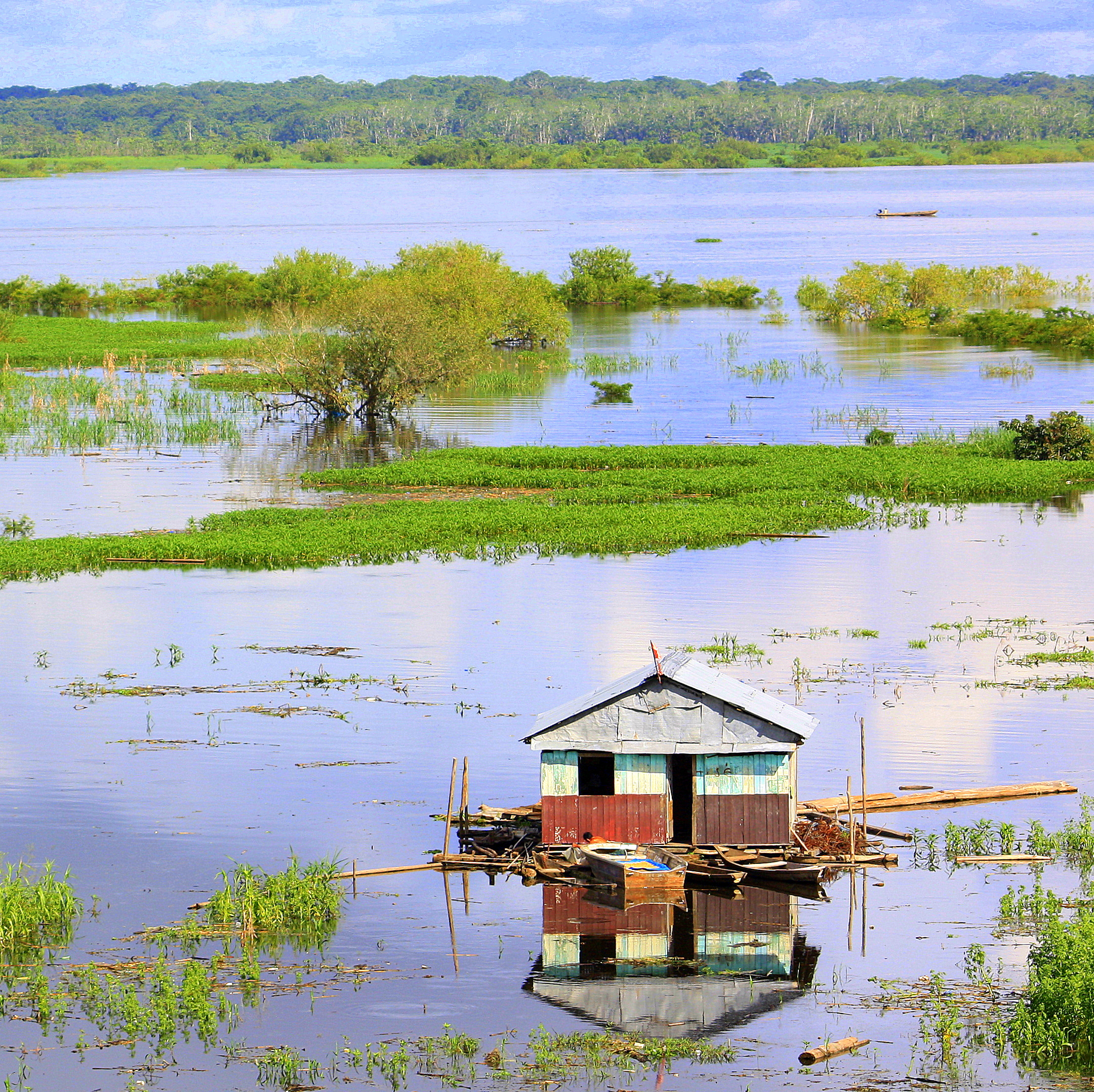
- A view of the Itaya River from the city of Iquitos

Location
- Country: Peru
- City: Iquitos

Physical characteristics
- Mouth
  - coordinates: 3°42′0″S 73°15′0″W
- Length: 213 km (132 mi)
- Basin size: 2,668 km^{2} (1,030 sq mi)2,530 km^{2} (980 mi^{2})
- Discharge
  - location: Iquitos (near mouth)
  - average: 153.27 m^{3}/s (5,413 cu ft/s) 108 m^{3}/s (3,800 cu ft/s)

Basin features
- River system: Amazon Basin

The Itaya River is a tributary of the Amazon River via the Nanay River in northern Peru. The Itaya flows alongside the city of Iquitos and the district of Belén.

In Iquitos, a riverwalk and breakwater called Malecón Tarapacá overlooks the Itaya. To the north of Malecón Tarapacá is Malecón Maldonado.

The Itaya River is the namesake of the fan palm genus Itaya, which was first discovered on the river's bank.

The 2012 floods of the Amazon, Itaya, and Nanay Rivers, amid the heaviest rains the region had endured in 40 years, left approximately 80,000 people homeless. In April 2015, 11 hours of steady rain swelled the Itaya again, causing the Iquitos–Nauta highway to collapse at four points: kilometres 22, 22.2, 23, and 26.

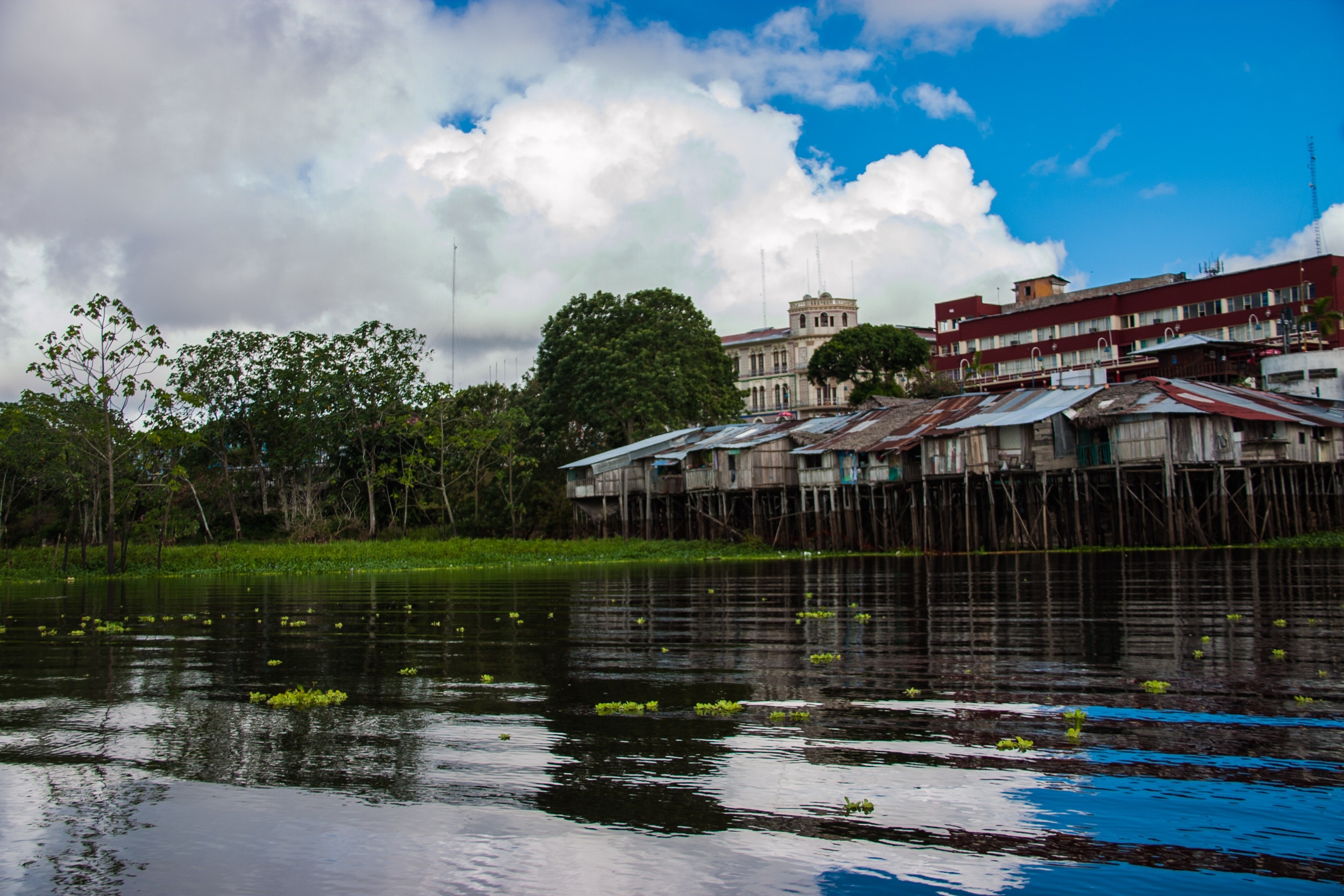
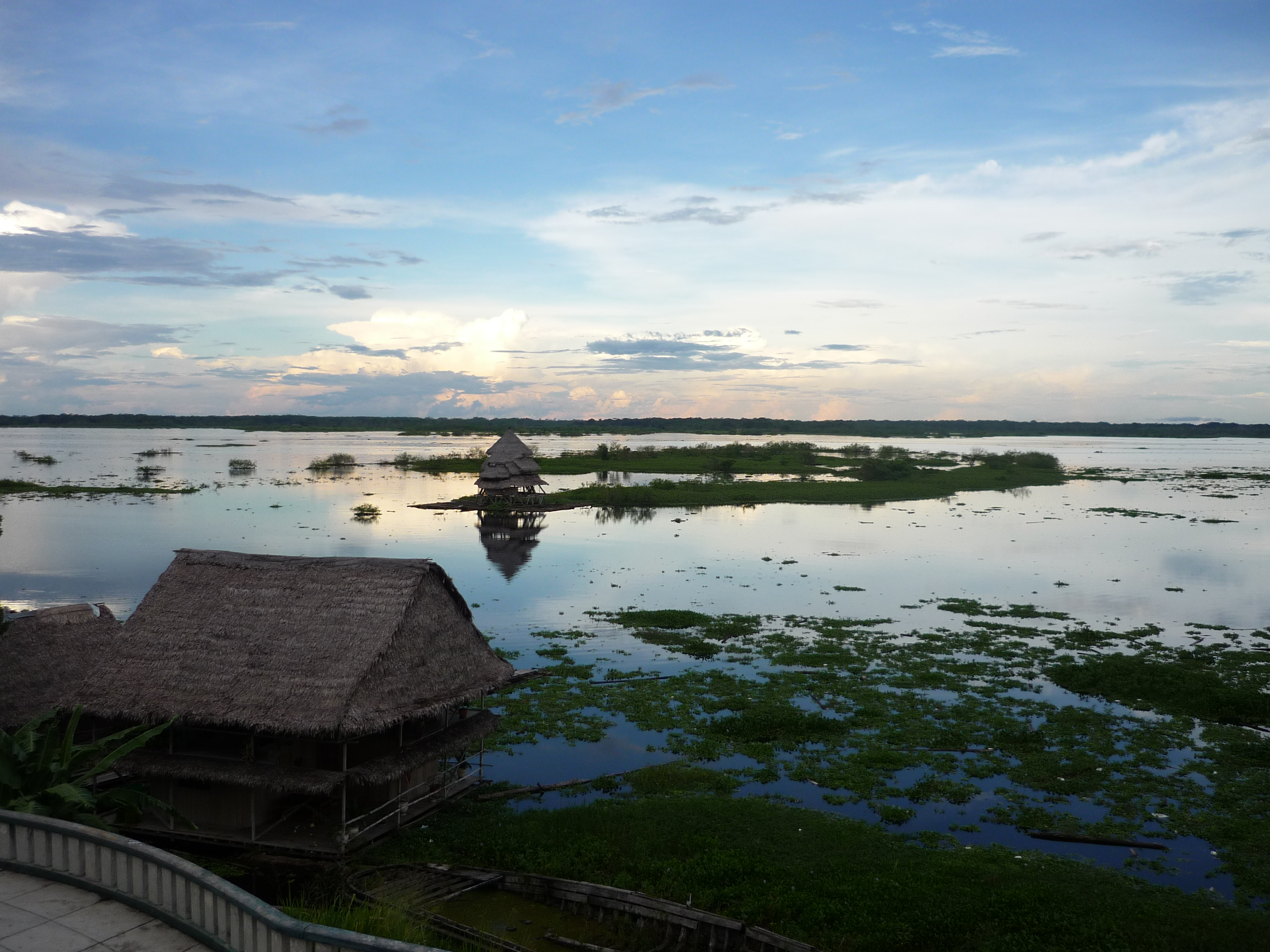
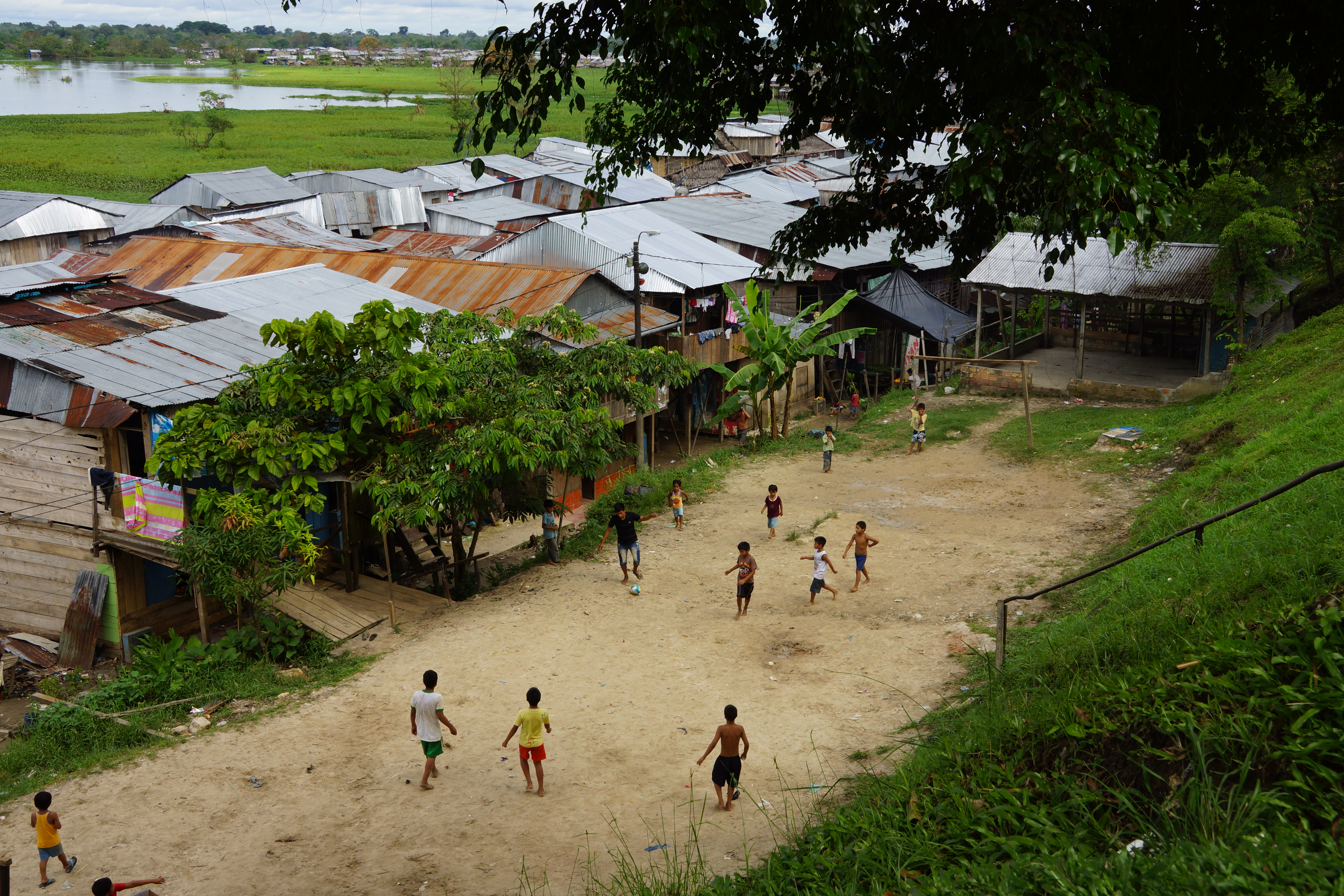
The Itaya River from vantages around Iquitos

== See also ==
- Marañón River
