= Nanay River =

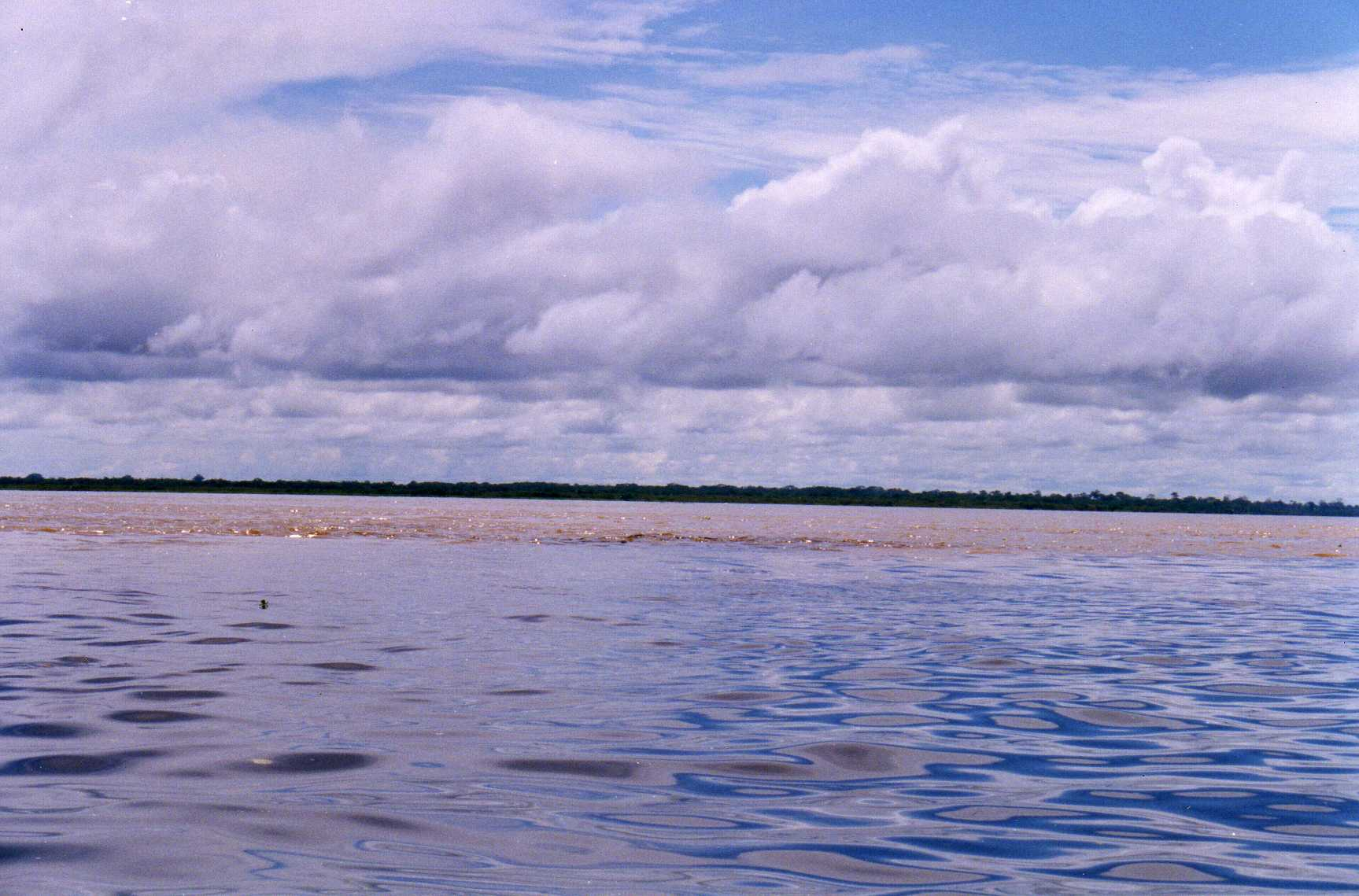
- The Nanay River (black) meets the Amazon River (light brownish; in background)

- Location of mouth

Location
- Country: Peru
- Region: Loreto Region

Physical characteristics
- Mouth: Amazon River
  - coordinates: 3°42′S 73°15′W
- Length: 315 km (196 mi)
- Basin size: 16,673.4 km^{2} (6,437.6 mi^{2}) 19,413 km^{2} (7,495 mi^{2})
- Discharge
  - location: Iquitos (near mouth)
  - average: 930 m^{3}/s (33,000 cu ft/s) 1,072.655 m^{3}/s (37,880.5 cu ft/s) 1,284 m^{3}/s (45,300 cu ft/s)

The Nanay River is a river in northern Peru. It is a tributary of the Amazon River, merging into this river at the city of Iquitos. The lower part of the Nanay flows to the north and west of the city, while the Itaya River flows to the south and east. Other nearby settlements on the Nanay River include the villages of Santo Tomás, Padre Cocha, and Santa Clara. During periods when the river is low, the many beaches along the Nanay are popular destinations. The Nanay belongs entirely to the lowlands, and is very crooked, has a slow current and divides into many canos (Note: A cano is a kind of natural canal; it forms a lateral discharge for surplus water from a river.) and strings of lagoons which flood the flat, low areas of country on either side. It is simply the drainage ditch of districts which are extensively overflowed in the rainy season. Captain Archibald Butt USN, ascended it 195 mi (314 km), to near its source. A part of the Nanay River flows through the Allpahuayo-Mishana National Reserve.

The Nanay is a blackwater river and it has a high fish species richness, including several that are well known from the aquarium industry. Some of these, notably green discus, are the result of accidental introductions that happened in the 1970s.

The river is the location of hundreds of illegal artisanal mines digging for gold.

The 2012 floods of the Amazon, Itaya, and Nanay rivers, amid the heaviest rains the region had faced in 40 years, left approximately 80,000 people homeless.
