= Belén District, Maynas =

Belén District
- District
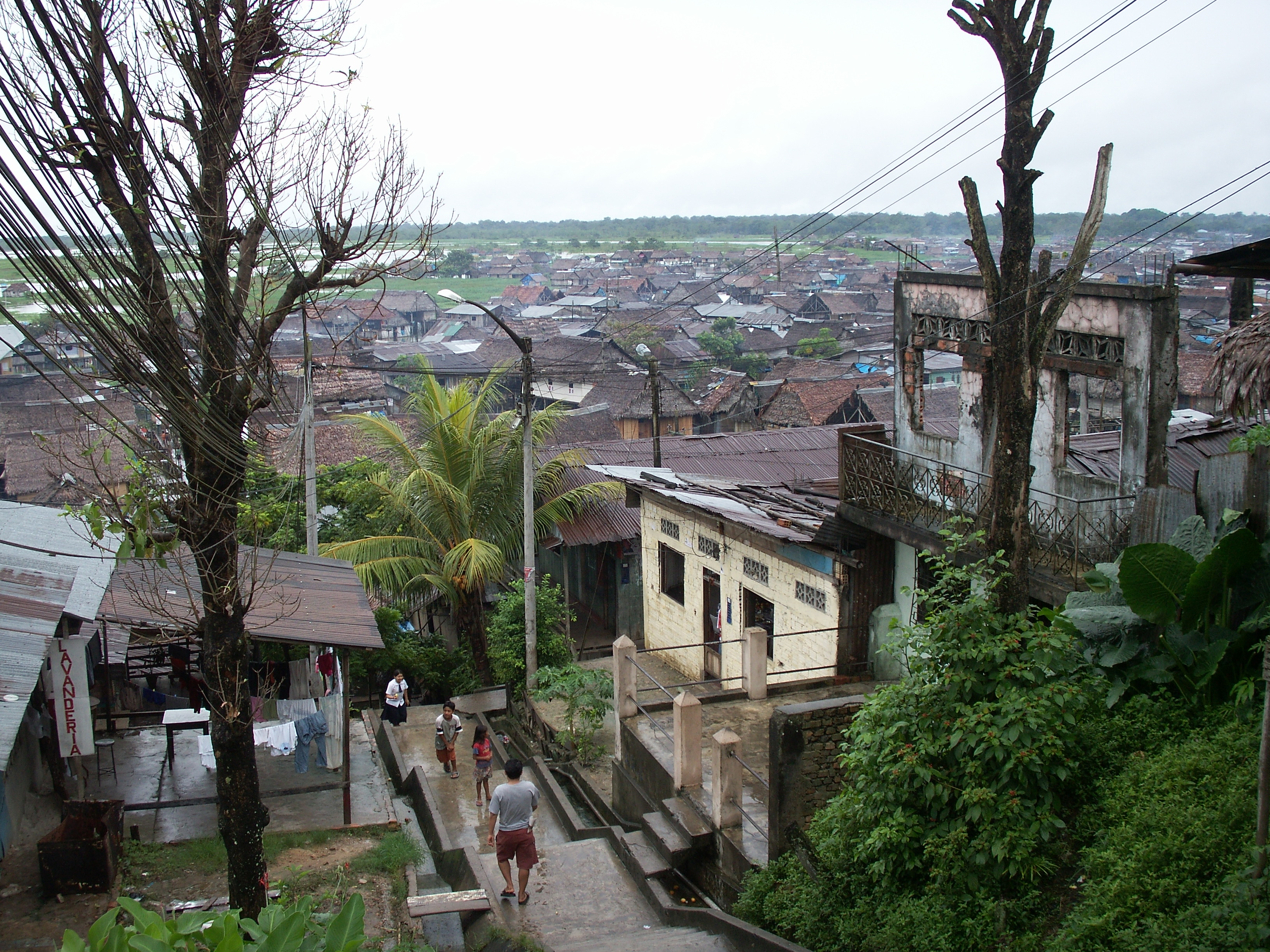
- Belén
- Interactive map of Belén District
- Coordinates: 3.7643°S 73.2505°W
- Country: Peru
- Region: Loreto
- Province: Maynas
- Founded: November 5, 1999
- Capital: Belén

Government
  - Mayor: Hermógenes Flores Gómez

Area
  - Total: 632.8 km^{2} (244.3 sq mi)
- Elevation: 110 m (360 ft)

Population (2005 census)
  - Total: 66,804
  - Density: 105.6/km^{2} (273.4/sq mi)
- Demonym: Beleño
- Time zone: UTC-5 (PET)
- UBIGEO: 160112

Belén District is one of thirteen districts of the Maynas Province in Peru. Belén (Spanish for Bethlehem) lies at the edge of the city of Iquitos, in the floodplain of the Itaya River. It is home to some 65,000 people, most of them poor, and many of whom live in extreme poverty. The housing does not have clean water, proper sanitation, or electric power distribution.

Many of the residents of Belén are people who lived in the forest, but who came to Iquitos in search of work and formal education for themselves and their families. Nevertheless, unemployment rates are high. Men might hunt, fish, or trade for their livelihood, while women resell small quantities of produce, such as aguaje. Some of those with more means shuttle goods via small motorboats between the forest hamlets and the city, dealing in such commodities as coffee, rice, sugar, gasoline, forest crops, and animal products. Uphill of the river is Mercado Belén, a large, open-air marketplace where vendors sell produce, meat, fish, spices, flowers, folk medicine, prepared foods, and manufactured goods. Brick-and-mortar storefronts also line the streets of the marketplace.

An estimated 60,000 people live across the river in outlying areas, also without electricity, water, or sanitation. Most homes either float or are built on stilts, as the river level rises 5–6 meters from February through July. Travel books have described Belén as the “Venice of Latin America”. In Pueblo Libre, a section of Belén on the waterfront, approximately 14,000 people—30% of whom are under age 12—live in a busy river port, where charcoal, bananas, fish, and other goods are brought (mostly by canoe) to be distributed and sold throughout Belén.

The people of Belén live in overcrowded conditions. 90% of homes house two or more families; some homes as many as five. The people of Belén are at risk for contracting malaria, dengue fever, water-borne illnesses, respiratory illnesses, tuberculosis, and HIV. They are also affected by social problems of severe poverty, such as alcoholism, crime, prostitution, unemployment, domestic violence, and child abuse. Years of deteriorating conditions in Belén have fostered widespread frustration and hopelessness among the residents.

== See also ==
- Cycle of poverty
- Loreto Region
- Shanty town
