= Maynas province =

Coordinates: 3.755148°S 73.249111°W

Maynas
- Province
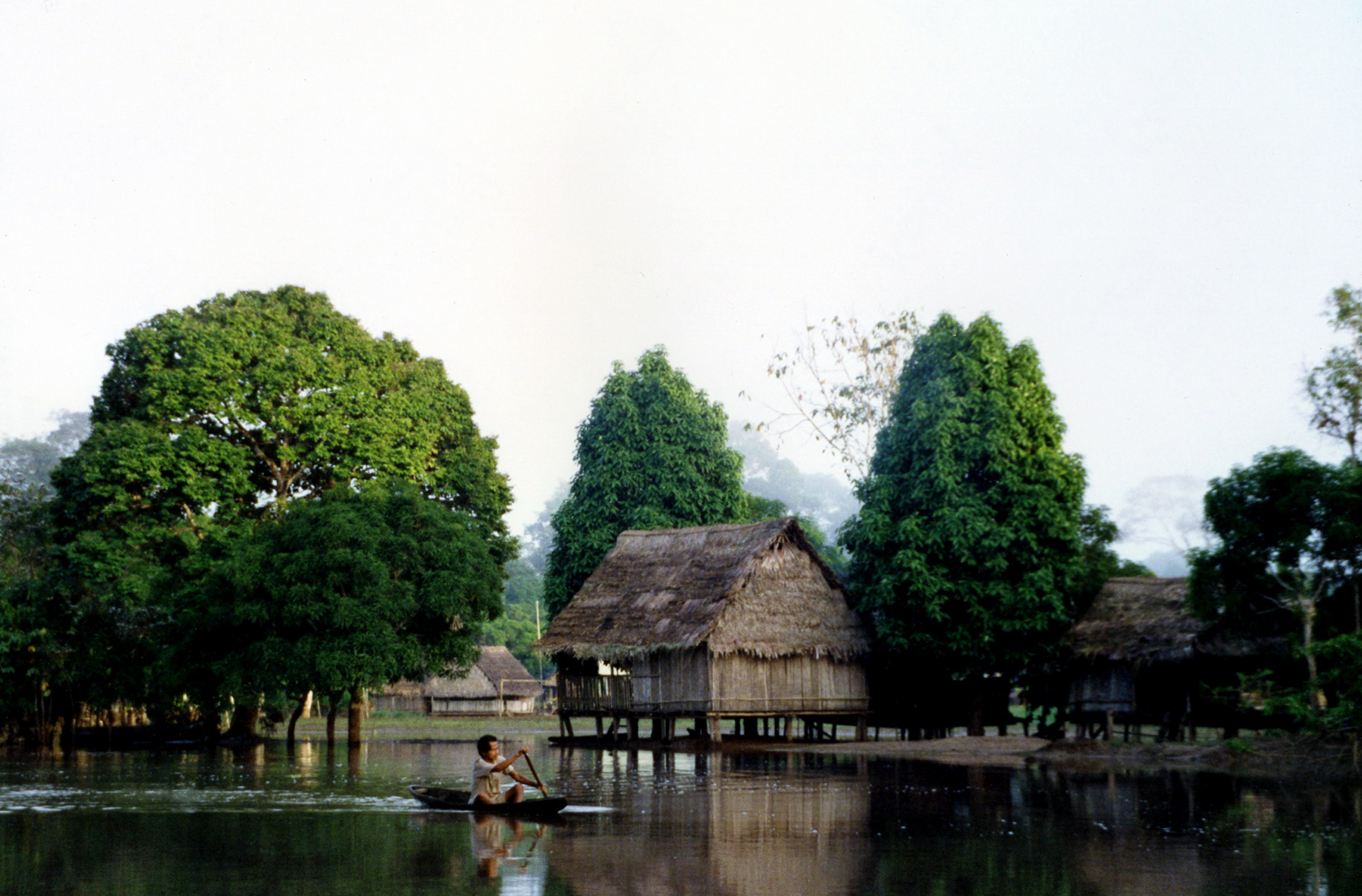

- Logo

- Location of Maynas in the Loreto Region
- Country: Peru
- Region: Loreto
- Capital: Iquitos

Government
  - Mayor: Francisco Sanjurjo Dávila (2019-2022)

Area
  - Total: 119,859.4 km^{2} (46,278.0 sq mi)
- Elevation: 106 m (348 ft)

Population
  - Total: 479,866
  - Density: 4.00357/km^{2} (10.3692/sq mi)
- UBIGEO: 1601
- Website: www.munimaynas.gob.pe

Maynas is one of the eight provinces in the Loreto Region in northeastern Peru. Its capital, Iquitos, is also Loreto's regional capital and the largest city in the Peruvian Amazon rainforest.

== History ==
A decree signed on 26 April 1822 signed by the Marquis of Torre Tagle, transformed what once was the General Command of Maynas into the Quijos Department, allowing it to also choose deputies. In 1925, Maynas was integrated into the Department of La Oroya.

In 1822, Joaquín Mosquera travelled on behalf of Colombia to request the restitution of the province. On July 25, 1824, the Congress of Gran Colombia issued a law of territorial division intending to include the Canton of Quijos in the Pichincha Province of the Department of Quito, according to the limits it had at the time of creation as the Viceroyalty of New Granada. It also intended to incorporate the Provinces of Jaén, Matamoros and Maynas into the Department of Azuay. The Peruvian refusal to give up the territories escalated tensions between the two countries, culminating in the Gran Colombia–Peru War.

Due to a law made effective on November 21, 1832, Maynas was integrated into the territory of the new Peruvian department of Amazonas, from which it separated in 1853, when a political government was created in the Loreto region.

== Geography ==
=== Boundaries ===
The Maynas Province is bordered by Ecuador on the northwest, Colombia on the north, northeast and east, the Mariscal Ramón Castilla and Requena provinces on the south, and the Loreto Province on the southwest.

== Demographics ==
=== Population ===
According to the 1993 Census, the Maynas Province has a population of 393,496 inhabitants, 50.6% of which (199,209) are male and 49.4% (194,287) are female.

As of 2005, the Instituto Nacional de Estadística e Informática estimates the province's population to be 536,423.

=== Languages ===
The majority of the province's residents (96%) speak Spanish at home; other languages spoken are Quechua (2%), Aymara (150 speakers, 0.0%), other indigenous languages (0.8%) and foreign languages (0.2%).

=== Immigration ===
Persons originating from other regions of the country make up 8.4% of the population and 0.3% of residents were born abroad.

The largest immigrant groups are from the San Martín Region (2.9% of the total population), the Lima Province/Lima Region (1.8%), and Ucayali Region (1.3%).

=== Age ===
The population age distribution is

- 54.1% under the age of 20,
- 8.9% from 20 to 24,
- 24.6% from 25 to 44,
- 9.5% from 45 to 64, and
- 3% who are 65 years of age or older.

=== Education ===
Secondary education has been attended by 28.8% of the population and 2.5% also have graduated from non-university higher education, while 2.6% have complete university studies. 46.7% only have attended primary education and 8.5% have not had any education.

The illiteracy rate in the province is 13.1%.

== Political division ==
The province is divided into eleven districts (Spanish: distritos, singular: distrito), each of which is headed by a mayor (alcalde). The districts, with their capitals in parentheses, are:

=== Districts ===
Districts of Iquitos city

1. Iquitos (Iquitos) (seat)
2. Alto Nanay (Santa María de Nanay)
3. Belén (Belén)
4. Fernando Lores (Tamshiyacu)
5. Indiana (Indiana)
6. Las Amazonas (Francisco de Orellana)
7. Mazán (Mazán)
8. Napo (Santa Clotilde)
9. Punchana (Punchana)
10. San Juan Bautista (San Juan Bautista)
11. Torres Causana (Pantoja)

== Local authorities ==
=== Mayors ===
- 2019-2022: Francisco Sanjurjo Dávila.
- 2015-2018: Fernando Meléndez Celis (Movimiento Integración Loretana).
- 2013-2014: Adela Esmeralda Jiménez Mera (Movimiento Integración Loretana).
- 2011-2012: Charles Mayer Zevallos Eyzaguirre (Movimiento Integración Loretana).

== Places of interest ==
- Allpahuayo-Mishana National Reserve
- Sunkaruqucha

== See also ==
- Administrative divisions of Peru
