= Purus Arch =

Brazilian sedimentary basin

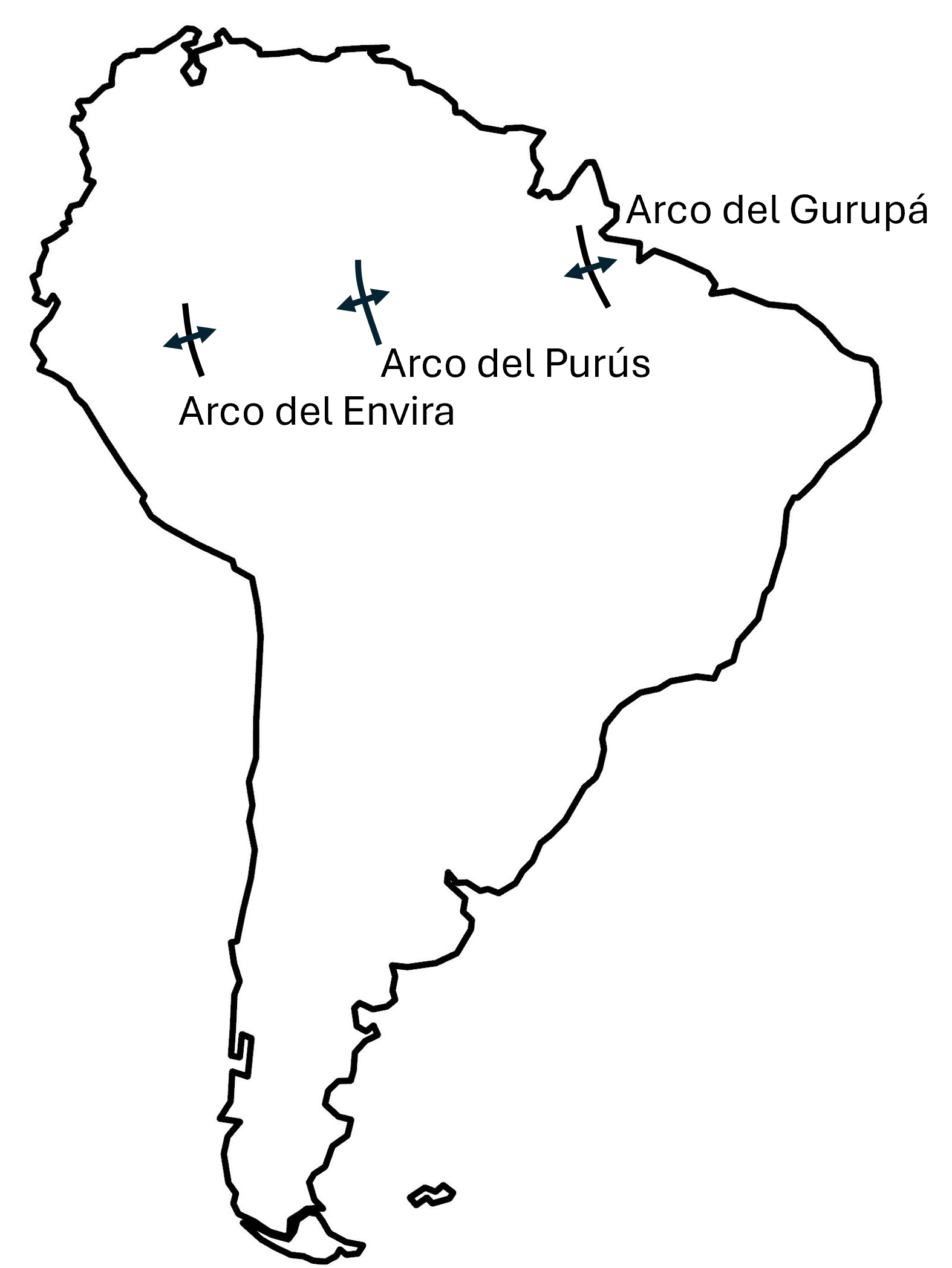

The Purus Arch (Portuguese: Arco do Purus) is a basement high in Brazil that makes up the modern western boundary of the Amazon sedimentary basin. The Purus Arch is thought to be a former graben of Middle Proterozoic age that was inversed in the Late Proterozoic.

Although not obviously noticeable, today the Purus Arch crosses the Amazon River near the mouth of the Purus River. Following the water breach of the arch about 8–10 million years ago, the western (cf. Pebas Mega-wetland) and eastern parts of the present-day Amazon basin became a unified system, which played an important role in the biogeography of many aquatic organisms in the region.
