= Las Amazonas District =

Coordinates: 3.4283°S 72.7758°W

Las Amazonas
- District
- Interactive map of Las Amazonas
- Country: Peru
- Region: Loreto
- Province: Maynas
- Founded: July 2, 1943
- Capital: Francisco de Orellana

Government
  - Mayor: Aldo Camilo Paino Inuma

Area
  - Total: 6,592.27 km^{2} (2,545.29 sq mi)
- Elevation: 103 m (338 ft)

Population (2005 census)
  - Total: 12,349
  - Density: 1.8733/km^{2} (4.8517/sq mi)
- Time zone: UTC-5 (PET)
- UBIGEO: 160105

Las Amazonas District is one of thirteen districts of the Maynas Province in Peru.
