= Tamshiyacu =

- Town
- Location within Peru
- Coordinates: 3°58′59.9″S 73°10′0.1″W
- Country: Peru
- Region: Loreto
- Provinces: Maynas
- Elevation: 106 m (348 ft)

Population
  - Total: 8,000

Tamshiyacu (in Quichua, Tamshi = rope; Yacu = water) is the name of a town in the Fernando Lores District located in Iquitos - northeastern Peru.

== Town of Tamshiyacu ==
Tamshiyacu City has a population of about 8,000. On the banks of the Amazon River about 50 km upstream from the city of Iquitos (about an hour by speedboat). The population of Tamshiyacu is dedicated to fishing and growing humari, pineapples, cassavas and bananas.

In the Peruvian Amazon one can find a variety of medicinal plants and trees. Ayahuasca is a traditional medicine in the Peruvian jungle, prepared by the shamans of the jungle.

Today many tourists come to Tamshiyacu to participate in ayahuasca ceremonies. Some believe that ayahuasca has healing properties. They also come to the jungle to cure many chronic diseases as these lands host healers and shamans. People also come to enjoy the beauty of the world's largest river and the charm of the Peruvian jungle.

Many people in Tamshiyacu feel disadvantaged in the modern world, and they wish to have a lifestyle like those in the Western part of the Earth.

== Climate ==
Climate data for Tamshiyacu, elevation 94 m (308 ft), (1991–2020)
Month	Jan	Feb	Mar	Apr	May	Jun	Jul	Aug	Sep	Oct	Nov	Dec	Year
Mean daily maximum °C (°F)	31.6 (88.9)	31.5 (88.7)	31.3 (88.3)	30.8 (87.4)	30.5 (86.9)	30.2 (86.4)	30.4 (86.7)	31.6 (88.9)	32.2 (90.0)	32.4 (90.3)	32.3 (90.1)	31.8 (89.2)	31.4 (88.5)
Mean daily minimum °C (°F)	21.7 (71.1)	21.7 (71.1)	21.6 (70.9)	21.6 (70.9)	21.7 (71.1)	21.1 (70.0)	20.8 (69.4)	20.9 (69.6)	21.5 (70.7)	22.0 (71.6)	22.0 (71.6)	21.7 (71.1)	21.5 (70.8)
Average precipitation mm (inches)	262.3 (10.33)	270.7 (10.66)	298.4 (11.75)	287.4 (11.31)	275.4 (10.84)	189.2 (7.45)	165.3 (6.51)	154.0 (6.06)	158.5 (6.24)	222.3 (8.75)	229.3 (9.03)	275.9 (10.86)	2,788.7 (109.79)
Source: National Meteorology and Hydrology Service of Peru
