= List of battles of the Peruvian Army =

This is a list of major battles fought by the Peruvian Army since its creation in 1821.

== War of Independence (1821–1826) ==
- Battle of Torata (January 19, 1823)
- Battle of Moquegua (January 21, 1823)
- Battle of Zepita (August 27, 1823)
- Battle of Junín (August 6, 1824)
- Battle of Ayacucho (December 9, 1824)
- Second siege of Callao (December 5, 1824 – January 23, 1826)

== Gran Colombia-Peru War (1828–1829) ==
- Battle of Saraguro (February 13, 1829)
- Battle of Portete de Tarqui (February 27, 1829)

== Wars of the Peru-Bolivian Confederation (1835–1839) ==
- Battle of Yanacocha (August 13, 1835)
- Battle of Uchumayo (February 4, 1836)
- Battle of Socabaya (February 7, 1836)
- Battle of Montenegro (June 24, 1838)
- Battle of Portada de Guías (August 21, 1838)
- Third siege of Callao (August 31, 1838 – November 8, 1838)
- Battle of Buin (January 6, 1839)
- Battle of Casma (January 12, 1839)
- Battle of Yungay (January 20, 1839)
- Iquicha War of 1839 (March–November 1839)

== War with Bolivia (1841–1842) ==
- Battle of Ingavi (November 18, 1841)
- Battle of Altos de Chipe (December 25, 1841)
- Battle of Motoni (December 26, 1841)
- Recapture of Tarapacá (January 2, 1842)
- Battle of Orurillo (April 3, 1842)

== Chincha Islands War (1865–1866) ==
- Battle of Callao (May 2, 1866)

== War of the Pacific (1879–1883) ==
- Battle of Pisagua (November 2, 1879)
- Battle of Pampa Germania (November 6, 1879)
- Battle of San Francisco (November 19, 1879)
- Battle of Tarapacá (November 27, 1879)
- Battle of Los Ángeles (March 22, 1880)
- Battle of Alto de la Alianza (May 26, 1880)
- Battle of Arica (July 7, 1880)
- Battle of San Juan and Chorrillos (January 13, 1881)
- Battle of Miraflores (January 15, 1881)
- Battle of Huamachuco (July 10, 1883)

== War with Colombia (1911) ==
- Battle of La Pedrera (July 10–12, 1911)

== Colombia–Peru War (1932–1933) ==
- Leticia Incident (September 1, 1932)
- Battle of Tarapacá (February 14, 1933)
- Battle of Buenos Aires (March 18, 1933)
- Battle of Güepí (March 26, 1933)

== Ecuadorian–Peruvian War (1941) ==
- Battle of Zarumilla (July 23–25, 1941)
- Battle of Pantoja and Rocafuerte (August 11, 1941)
- Battle of Jambelí (July 25, 1941)
- Occupation of Puerto Bolívar (July 31, 1941)

== Sources ==
- Basadre, Jorge, Historia de la República del Perú. Editorial Universitaria, 1983.
