= Battle of Buenos Aires =

Battle of the Colombia–Peru War

- Part of the Colombia–Peru War
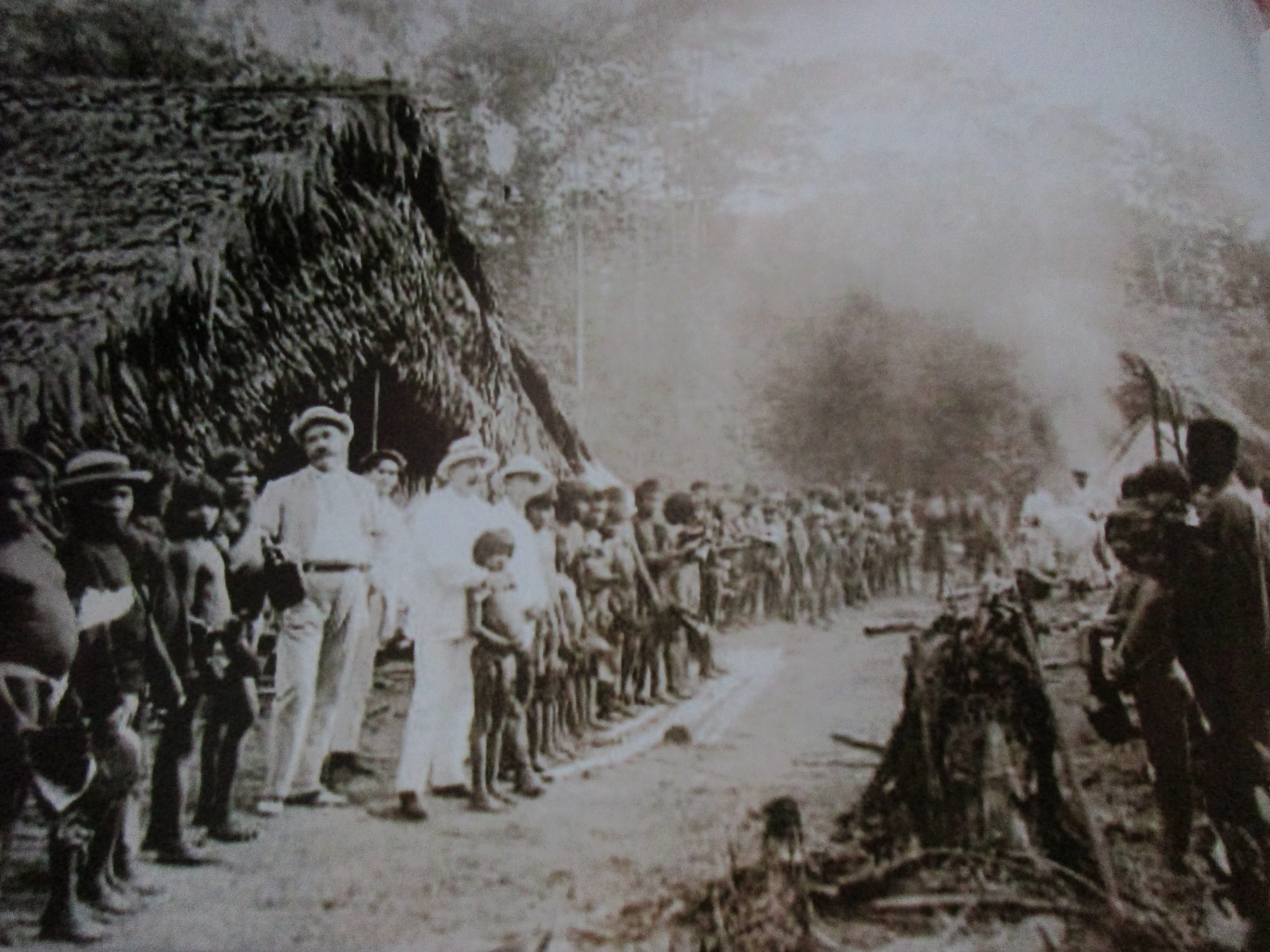
- Caucheria in the Peruvian jungle
Date	18 March 1933
Location	Buenos Aires, Amazonas Department, Colombia
Result	Colombian victory
Territorial changes	Colombia achieves dominion over the northern part of the Amazon Trapeze

Belligerents
Colombia	Peru

Units involved
Putumayo Detachment	Buenos Aires Garrison

The Battle of Buenos Aires was a military confrontation that occurred on March 18, 1933, during the Colombia–Peru War where a group of soldiers from the Colombian Army and Air Force attacked the Peruvian post of Buenos Aires, located in the Amazon Trapeze, today part of the Colombian Department of Amazonas. The event occurred a month after the Battle of Tarapacá.

== Background ==
A month after the Battle of Tarapacá, the Colombian forces had obtained control of the town and Peruvian garrison of Tarapacá, the Peruvians had control of Leticia and the entire southern zone of the Putumayo River. Colombian General Alfredo Vásquez Cobo discussed with his peers the decision to invade Güeppí or directly attack the well-protected Leticia, making the decision to invade Güepí little over a week later.

== Battle ==
A battalion of the Colombian army carried out a surprise attack on the Peruvian Buenos Aires Garrison, as well as civilians who were in that area. The Colombian troops did not expect the civil support for the Peruvian forces, but victory was nevertheless achieved when the expeditionary planes bombed what remained of the garrison, after which the soldiers took prisoners and raised the Colombian flag. Although the attack was carried out without authorization, the victory of the combat served for Colombia to obtain definitive control of the northern zone of the Amazon Trapeze. surrounding the city of Leticia, then controlled by Peruvian forces.
