= Rio Protocol (1934) =

1934 treaty between Colombia and Peru

Protocol of Peace, Friendship and Cooperation and Additional Act Between the Republic of Colombia and the Republic of Peru
- Peru–Colombia border
- Type: Bilateral treaty
- Signed: 24 May 1934
- Location: Rio de Janeiro, Brazil
- Negotiators: (Brazil) Afrânio de Melo Franco
- Signatories: (Colombia) Roberto Urdaneta; (Colombia) Luis Cano; (Colombia) Guillermo Valencia; (Peru) Víctor Maúrtua; (Peru) Víctor Belaúnde; (Peru) Alberto Ulloa
- Parties: Colombia; Peru
- Languages: Spanish

Full text
- es:Protocolo de Amistad y Cooperación entre la República de Colombia y la República del Perú at Wikisource

The Protocol of Peace, Friendship and Cooperation and Additional Act Between the Republic of Colombia and the Republic of Peru, also known simply as the Rio Protocol, was an international agreement signed in Rio de Janeiro between Colombia and Peru on May 24, 1934.

The Protocol was intended to finally resolve the long-running territorial dispute between the two countries, and brought about the official end of the Colombia–Peru War.

== Background ==
The dispute between Colombia and Peru over the sovereignty of the Amazon basin dates back to the aftermath of the wars of independence. Gran Colombia fought a war with Peru over a border dispute in the area of Tumbes, Jaén and Maynas. The Treaty of Guayaquil put an end to the military campaign but problems arose due to the subsequent dissolution of Gran Colombia, among them the continuity of the border issue.

Direct and continuous negotiations between Colombia and Peru only began in 1894. Until then, the discussion only concerned the latter and Ecuador. That year, tripartite negotiations began, which did not produce results. The areas in dispute between Colombia and Peru were mainly the Caquetá and Putumayo basins. The colonization attempts of both countries led to armed clashes, most notably that of La Pedrera in 1911. The two countries tried arbitration, without reaching an agreement on who would fulfill that role.

=== Salomón–Lozano Treaty ===
Once the negotiations were restarted, on March 24, 1922, a direct agreement was reached in Lima, the work of the plenipotentiaries Fabio Lozano Torrijos (representing Colombia) and Alberto Salomón Osorio (representing Peru). The Putumayo River was designated as the limit, except in a strip known as the Amazonian trapeze, under the sovereignty of Colombia.

The border line between the Peruvian Republic and the Republic of Colombia is agreed, agreed and fixed in the terms that are expressed below: From the point where the meridian of the mouth of the Cuhimbé River in Putumayo intersects the San Miguel River or Sucumbíos, go up that same meridian to said mouth of the Cuhimbé; from there by the Putumayo River to the confluence of the Yaguas River; follows a straight line that from this confluence goes to the Atacuari River in the Amazon and from there through the Amazon River to the border between Peru and Brazil established in the Peru-Brazilian Treaty of October 23, 1851.

=== Colombia–Peru War ===
On September 1, 1932, a group of 48 Peruvian citizens from Loreto stormed the small town of Leticia to claim it as Peruvian, expelling the Colombian authorities and sending them to Brazil. This act, initially considered a domestic problem, was the one that gave rise to the Colombian–Peruvian war. The clashes took place along the Putumayo River and the Amazon trapeze, recalling clashes such as the Battle of Tarapacá on February 14 and the Battle of Güepí on March 26, 1933, already on May 23, 1933, the diplomatic agreement ending the military actions was signed in Geneva. The Peruvian army vacated Leticia a month later just as the Colombian army returned Güepí to Peru.

== Negotiations (1933–1934) ==
=== First stage ===
On October 24, 1933, the commission destined to settle the dispute met, which was installed by the Brazilian Foreign Minister Afrânio de Melo Franco. The Peruvian part was made up of Víctor Maúrtua, Víctor Andrés Belaúnde, Alberto Ulloa Sotomayor and Raúl Porras Barrenechea. The Colombian delegation, by Roberto Urdaneta Arbeláez, Luis Cano Villegas and Guillermo Valencia Castillo.

On October 31, the second meeting between the Peruvian and Colombian delegations took place. In it, the method to be adopted in the negotiations was discussed, since the Colombian representation maintained that it was up to the Peruvian to present what it considered to be pending problems in order to study possible solutions. On the contrary, the Peruvian commission stated that both parties should present memorandums expressing their points of view. The heads of both representations were appointed to seek a solution, in addition to agreeing on a series of informative communications, until another procedure was necessary to record the points of agreement and divergence. In the heads' talks, it was agreed to adopt a common agenda, for which the two delegations would present memorandums. However, given the irreconcilable differences between the two notes, it was decided to dispense with them.

Both parties would meet again on November 28 and December 1, 4 and 18. In the sessions, the Peruvian delegation spoke of Colombia's noncompliance with the Salomón-Lozano treaty, by not delivering the Sucumbíos Triangle to Peru (which had been ceded in exchange for the Leticia trapeze); the impracticability of the treaty; and the economic, geographical and historical inconveniences of the line drawn by the 1922 treaty. Finally, the Peruvian side concluded that the only possible solution was to change the border, with the luck that the triangle would return to Colombia and the trapeze to Peru.

The Peruvian conclusion was rejected by the Colombian commission, indicating that the Conference held did not discuss the Salomón-Lozano Treaty and that there was no territorial question for the change of border. In addition, he pointed out that the solution to the observations made by Peru was to sign a series of navigation and trade agreements in the Putumayo and the Amazon. The Peruvian delegation rejected these agreements which were, in their opinion, unimportant.

Faced with Colombia's refusal to discuss the Sucumbíos issue, the Peruvian side suggested that the discussions result in an equity arbitration constituted ad hoc. Once again, the Peruvian proposal was rejected, with the Colombians suggesting that, for any legal problem, it was necessary to resort to the Permanent Court of International Justice in The Hague. The Peruvian side rejected that idea, stating that a court was inadequate to solve the problem, insisting on arbitration.

=== Second stage ===
On February 20, 1934, Brazilian Foreign Minister Melo Franco returned to Rio de Janeiro and met with the heads of both parties to seek a solution due to the negotiations being stalled. Both parties formally submitted memorandums, illustrating their positions at the time.

The negotiations continued, insisting on the Peruvian position in several exchanges of territories, all of which were rejected by the Colombian delegation. At that time, the deadline for the administration of Leticia by the League of Nations was about to expire, so the Peruvian side requested an extension, a request that was also rejected by the Colombian delegation. Given this, the Peruvian position proposed a mixed commission for the administration of Leticia, a proposal also rejected.

=== Third stage ===
The Peruvian delegation continued to insist on a mixed commission for Leticia, slowly putting aside the territorial issue. The mediation of the Brazilian foreign minister was essential for both parties to reach an agreement in Rio de Janeiro. The divergent points between the two parties were liquidated, until in May 1934 a definitive agreement was reached.

== The Protocol ==
The Protocol of Friendship and Cooperation between the Republic of Colombia and the Republic of Peru was signed on May 24, 1934, ratifying the Salomón–Lozano Treaty, still in force today and accepted by both parties.

== The Peruvian-Ecuadorian issue ==
Peru invited Ecuador to begin negotiations in order to settle the question of pending limits between the two countries, which it refused. The country was an interested party in the dispute between Colombia and Peru, not only because of territorial contiguity, but also because there was an area that the three countries claimed. The Ecuadorian Congress declared that it would not recognize the validity of the arrangements between its two neighbors.

== Bibliography ==
- Bustillo, Policarpo (1911). Reseña histórica de los límites entre Perú y Colombia (PDF).
- Porras Barrenechea, Raúl (1926). Historia de los límites del Perú (PDF). Librería Francesa Científica y Casa Editorial E. Rosay.
- Basadre Grohmann, Jorge (2005). Historia de la República del Perú (1822-1933) (PDF). Empresa Editora El Comercio S. A. ISBN 9972205622.
