= Assassination of Luis Miguel Sánchez Cerro =

1933 murder of the President of Peru

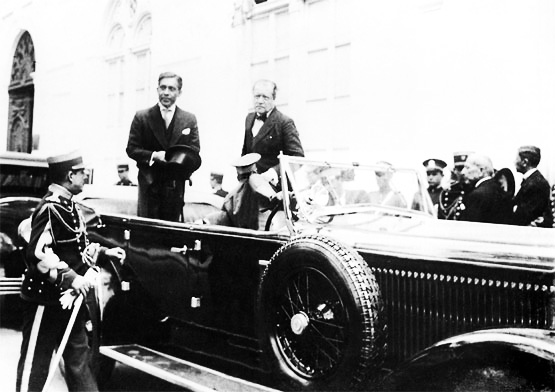
- Sánchez Cerro minutes prior to his murder
- Location: Santa Beatriz racetrack in Santa Beatriz, Lima, Peru
- Date: April 30, 1933; 93 years ago 11:10 p.m. (PET)
- Target: Luis Miguel Sánchez Cerro
- Weapon: FN M1900
- Deaths: Luis Miguel Sánchez Cerro; Mr. Rodríguez Pisco (Note: His name is reported as either José or Teodoro.); Abelardo Mendoza Leyva
- Injuries: Five guards and three civilians
- Perpetrator: Abelardo Mendoza Leyva

On April 30, 1933, Luis Miguel Sánchez Cerro, then president of Peru, was assassinated while riding in his presidential convertible at the Santa Beatriz racetrack in Santa Beatriz, a neighbourhood of Lima, Peru. Sánchez Cerro was accompanied by Prime Minister José Matías Manzanilla, Chief of Military Staff Antonio Rodríguez Ramírez and his aide-de-camp, Major Eleazar Atencio, when he was fatally shot by APRA militant Abelardo Mendoza Leyva. Sánchez Cerro was rushed to the Italian Hospital where he was pronounced dead two hours later. Also killed in the attack was Mr. Rodríguez Pisco, a member of the Republican Guard who had attempted to protect the president.

Sánchez Cerro was immediately replaced by Óscar R. Benavides as president after he was elected by Congress. As head of the Revolutionary Union, his political party, he was replaced by Luis A. Flores. The assassination led to a diplomatic end of the ongoing armed conflict with Colombia, as Benavides met with President Alfonso López Pumarejo two weeks later, agreeing to cease hostilities and handing over the disputed area to a League of Nations delegation, ultimately signing the Rio Protocol in 1934.

== Background ==
After the anarchy unleashed in Peru after the fall of Augusto B. Leguía's second presidency in 1930, the situation stabilised in 1931 with the installation of the National Junta of David Samanez Ocampo, which called for general elections, in which Luis Miguel Sánchez Cerro, the soldier who had been the architect of Leguía's downfall, won.

It was expected that life in the country would normalise with the return to democracy, but Sánchez Cerro's rival in the elections, Víctor Raúl Haya de la Torre, leader of the newly founded American Popular Revolutionary Alliance (APRA)—then with an anti-oligarchic and anti-imperialist tendency—did not recognise his victory and went into armed opposition. A civil war ensued, whose most violent point was the 1932 Trujillo uprising.

Sánchez Cerro had already been shot at on March 6, 1932, while attending mass in Miraflores. The perpetrator was José Melgar, an APRA member.

== Assassination ==
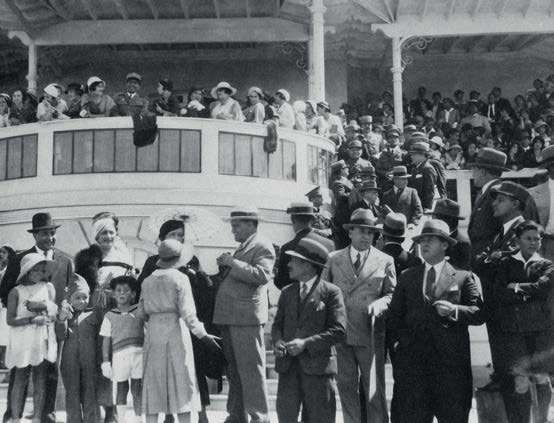
Sánchez Cerro at the racetrack.

On the morning of April 30, 1933, Sánchez Cerro reviewed the recruits who were going to fight in the ongoing armed conflict with Colombia and who were gathered at the Santa Beatriz Hippodrome, today the Campo de Marte. Once the ceremony was over, he left in his vehicle, an open-topped Hispano-Suiza car, amidst the applause of the crowd.

Accompanying the president inside the car were Prime Minister José Matías Manzanilla, Chief of Military Staff Antonio Rodríguez Ramírez and his aide-de-camp, Major Eleazar Atencio. Sánchez Cerro sat in the back seat of the car, on the right side, while Manzanilla was to his left. Rodríguez and Atencio were in the front seats, in addition to the pilot. Next to it was a horse escort and followed by another car, where the members of the Military Staff were riding. The vehicle moved slowly, in the middle of the crowd, at the request of the president himself, who wanted to avoid any accidents.

It was in that circumstance when Mendoza breached the human chain holding back the crowd, rushed towards the presidential car, and holding onto the hood, fired several shots towards the president's back. The driver accelerated the car, throwing Mendoza to the ground, who was instantly shot by the presidential escort and by the members of the military staff who were in the other car. Some soldiers from the escort even pierced him with their spears. The autopsy protocol would later determine that Mendoza's body received twenty gunshot wounds caused by thirteen projectiles, and four spear wounds that destroyed a lung, liver and intestines.

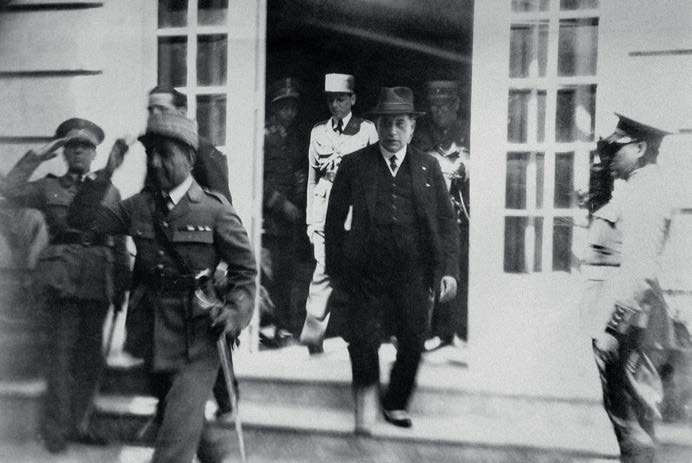
Sánchez Cerro leaves the scene.

The weapon used by Mendoza, a Browning pistol, was picked up by an individual named Ángel Millán Ramos, an employee of Huancayo's post office, who took it with him. But a witness reported him, and he was captured and implicated in the crime.

In the confusing shootout, one of the members of the security staff, gendarme Rodríguez Pisco, who had chased Mendoza, was also killed, and a second lieutenant, two corporals and two soldiers were wounded. It is believed that there were civilians who fired from afar, hiding in some trees and palm trees, which has given rise to the theory of a plot.

As for Sánchez Cerro, he was rushed to the Italian Hospital (located at the intersection of Grau and Abancay avenues) where he was treated by doctors Juan Luis Raffo, Abel Delgado and Teófilo Rocha. Serum and tonic injections were applied, but after two hours of agony, he died at 1:10 p.m. According to the doctors' report, one of the two shots he received hit him in the precordial area, lodging in his heart and causing internal bleeding, which caused his death.

== Perpetrator and aftermath ==
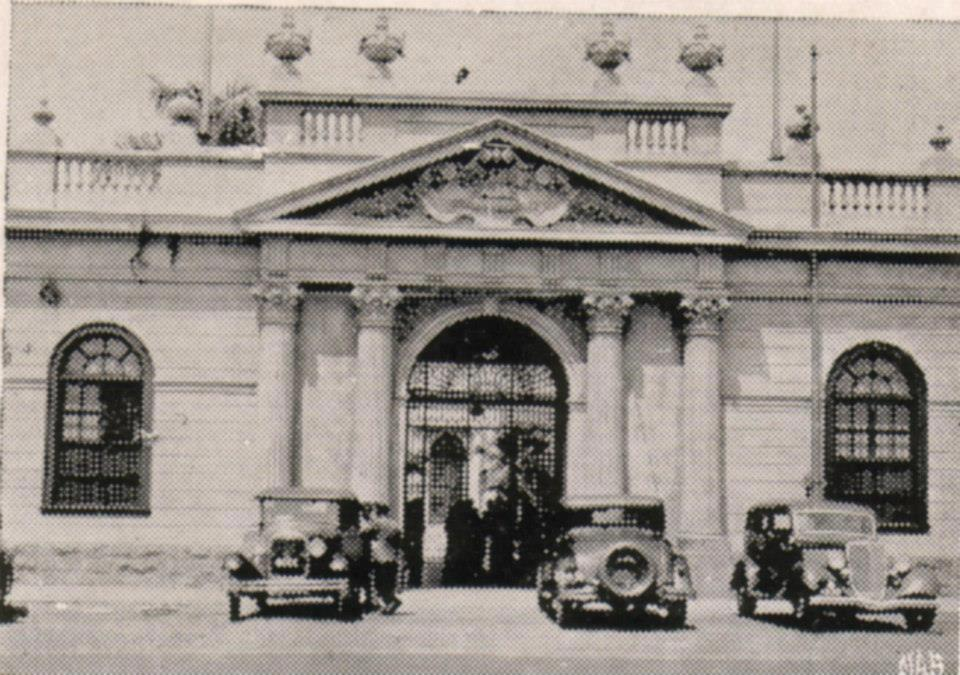
The entrance to the Italian Hospital where Sánchez Cerro died.

The murderer was identified as Abelardo Mendoza Leyva. In the police report he is described as a young man of 19 years (that is, he was a minor according to the law at that time), with mixed-race features, of short stature and dressed humbly. Investigating his background, it was learned that he was a native of Cerro de Pasco, who survived in the capital by working casual jobs, preferably in bars and restaurants; that in 1931 he had joined the APRA party; and that on April 4, 1933 (that is, 26 days before the assassination) he had been released from prison, after being imprisoned for nearly a month for alleged partisan activities. The weapon he used was a Browning automatic pistol, which was almost new. The latter drew attention, since it was an expensive weapon, which a person of his condition would hardly have been able to acquire with his own resources. It was said that the person who incited him to commit the crime was Leopoldo Pita, a lower-ranking APRA leader, who would have acted as his advisor.

Although Mendoza was affiliated with APRA, the party denied having any involvement in the attack, and described it as a personal and anarchist act. However, Armando Villanueva del Campo, a personal friend of Haya de la Torre, recognised in his book La gran persecución (co-authored with Guillermo Thorndike) that there was indeed a plot in the murder of Sánchez Cerro, in which a sector of the APRA party participated, of which Leopoldo Pita was a part.

Villanueva also said that, talking about this event many years later with Luis A. Flores, the leader of Sanchecerrismo, he told him that, although for the government there was no doubt of APRA participation, the difficult thing was to identify which was the conspiring group behind Mendoza, since there were several groups of APRAs who had the expressed desire of killing the president.

These groups apparently acted in isolation, without any coordination between them. For example, it was said that on the same day of the assassination, two APRA members, Jorge Idiáquez and Alfredo Tello, prepared hand bombs to throw at the presidential car as it passed through the Jirón de la Unión. All of this had happened regardless of the plan that Mendoza carried out.

=== Legal process ===
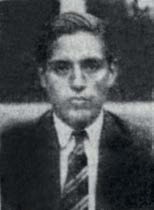
Abelardo Mendoza Leyva, deceased, was identified as the shooter.

A court martial took charge of the process, presided over by colonel Maximiliano Frías and made up of captains Humberto León Ravines, Manuel Marchena and Miguel San Román, and Lieutenant Pedro de la Torre Ugarte. Major Julio Barrionuevo was the prosecutor. Nineteen suspects related to APRA were arrested, all of humble origins. During the trial, they reported having been subjected to torture to extract confessions. One of the defendants, Filomeno Sacco Espíritu, committed suicide in his cell by manipulating electrical cables (at least that was the official version).

In his accusation, the prosecutor identified Abelardo Mendoza as the sole perpetrator of the crime, and as his accomplices those who had been close to him, among whom were Pedro Catalino Lévano, Alejandro Cortijo and Leopoldo Pita. And a group of people were identified as accessories, among whom was Ángel Millán Ramos, the one who had collected the murder weapon. Once the process began, the Prosecutor surprisingly withdrew his accusation of accomplices and accessories, maintaining only the accusation of accessory in Ángel Millán Ramos.

The court-martial ruling identified Abelardo Mendoza Leyva as the sole perpetrator. Although he admitted that a plot had existed, he acknowledged that it could not be proven that the rest of the defendants had been accomplices, due to lack of concrete evidence. He also accused the political and police authorities of omission, for not having given the necessary protection to the person of the president.

=== Conspiracy theories ===
Quickly, a theory of the plot in the murder of Sánchez Cerro emerged, which involved General Benavides in an understanding with the APRA or with Haya de la Torre himself. This furtive pact would have allowed Benavides to come to power and the Apristas would be able to enjoy a political opening, although ephemerally. The architect Augusto Benavides Diez Canseco, brother-in-law of the general and great friend of the APRA leader, would have served as a link between Benavides and Haya de la Torre.

One of those who accused Benavides of being the author of the murder appears to have been Luis A. Flores, the leader of the Revolutionary Union and supporter of Sánchez Cerro, who was then a congressman. In a session of Congress held on August 26, 1935, with the presence of the ministerial cabinet, the Government Minister on duty, Colonel Antonio Rodríguez Ramírez, requested the removal of Flores from immunity for contempt and slander. According to Rodríguez, Flores had said during a party speech that the murderer was in the Palace, unequivocally alluding to General Benavides. Flores denied having said that, and later accused the supporters of the late President Leguía, overthrown by Sánchez Cerro, of being the perpetrators of the crime. All of these contradictions make Flores' testimony unreliable.

The defenders of the theory of a conspiracy in which important politicians and military personnel in office would be involved to favour Óscar R. Benavides, are based on the following details of the assassination:

- An armed stranger managed to get too close to the presidential motorcade and no one noticed, managing to make his way between a line of gendarmes and the president's bodyguards, firing three shots in the president's back, without them reacting in a timely manner. There were a total of 180 people who protected the president, outside of the police.
- Instead of capturing the murderer alive, one of the president's aides-de-camp killed him immediately, and other guards finished him off, when the most appropriate thing would have been to keep him alive to interrogate him and thus learn about his motivations or other possible suspects.
- According to the report by Dr. Carlos Brignardello, published in the newspaper El Comercio, the president's body presented two types of gunshots: one of a smaller caliber, with an up-and-down trajectory; and one of a larger caliber, with a trajectory from "bottom to top and from front to back", a shot made at very close range, which entered through the chest and was fatal from the first moment. The smallest caliber shot, from top to bottom, would be that of Mendoza Leyva, but the other shot, the one that caused death, was impossible to have been fired by Mendoza Leyva himself, if the ballistic trajectory and the different caliber are taken into account. Who could have fired that fatal shot would be left to speculation.
- There was a rumour that a person from the presidential entourage, who was never identified, had convinced Sánchez Cerro not to use his bulletproof vest or his armored car, ensuring him total security during the event. Commenting on this fact, historian Jorge Basadre considers that this attitude of Sánchez Cerro was reckless, taking into account that he had already suffered an attack previously, and considering the terrible confrontation that the country was experiencing.

== Consequences ==
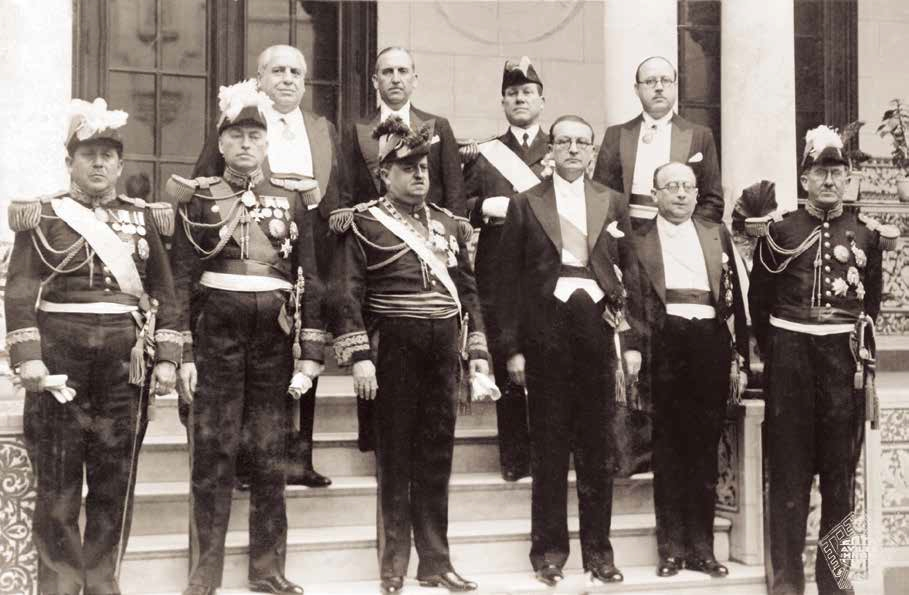
Newly elected President Óscar R. Benavides and his cabinet in 1933.

With the death of President Sánchez Cerro, a state of siege and the suspension of constitutional guarantees were declared. That same day, the Constituent Congress, by 81 votes out of a total of 88 representatives present, elected General Óscar R. Benavides to finish the presidential term of Sánchez Cerro, which should have ended in 1936. This was an extraconstitutional departure, since the law prohibited a serving military officer from assuming the presidency, but the state of international danger and internal war that the country was experiencing was argued in favour of this solution. The same army supported the election.

One of the first acts of the new government was the settlement of peace with Colombia. Benavides received in Lima the newly elected president of that country, Alfonso López Pumarejo, who had been his friend since the days when both had been diplomats in London. Both immediately agreed to a truce. Bilateral negotiations later culminated with the signing of a protocol in 1934.

Internally, Benavides passed an amnesty law that allowed the freedom of those prosecuted for political reasons, including Haya de la Torre, and the return of Aprista exiles was allowed, although this opening would not last for long.

== See also ==
- Colombia–Peru War

== Bibliography ==
- Basadre, Jorge (2005). Historia de la República del Perú: 8.º periodo: El comienzo de la irrupción de las masas organizadas en la política (1930-1933). Vol. 16 (9th ed.). Lima: Empresa Editora El Comercio S. A. ISBN 9972-205-78-9.
- Basadre Grohmann, Jorge (2014). Historia de la República del Perú [1822–1933] (in Spanish). Vol. 15–16. Lima: Producciones Cantabria S.A.C. ISBN 978-612-306-353-5.
- Chirinos, Enrique (1985). Historia de la República (1930-1985). Desde Sánchez Cerro hasta Alan García. Vol. 2 (3rd ed.). Lima, Perú: AFA Editores.
- Pons Muzzo, Gustavo (1980). Historia del Perú. La República (1868-1980). Lima: Librería, Distribuidora Bazar San Miguel E.I.R.L.
- Villanueva, Armando; Thorndike, Guillermo (2004). La Gran Persecución. Lima: Empresa Periodística Nacional S.A. (EPENSA). ISBN 9972-9249-1-2.
