= Abelardo Mendoza Leyva =

Peruvian APRA militant; assassin of Luis Miguel Sánchez Cerro

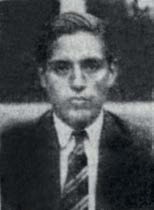
- Born: April 11, 1914; Cerro de Pasco, Peru
- Died: April 30, 1933 (aged 19); Lima, Peru
- Known for: Perpetrator of the assassination of Luis Miguel Sánchez Cerro

Abelardo Mendoza Leyva (Cerro de Pasco; April 11, 1914 — Lima; April 30, 1933) was a Peruvian militant of the American Popular Revolutionary Alliance (APRA) who assassinated President Luis Miguel Sánchez Cerro while he was reviewing troops at the Santa Beatriz racetrack and was at the same time killed by his presidential escort.

== Biography ==
Born in Cerro de Pasco, he arrived in Lima at a very young age. He got a job as a domestic in a warehouse located on the second block of Malambo Street (current Francisco Pizarro Avenue, in Rímac). He stayed there for three years, until, wanting to earn more money, and with the recommendation of his former boss, he started working as an employee at the La Piñita bar, located on a corner of Nicolás de Piérola Avenue. At La Piñita he worked for four years, until 1930, when he was fired after being caught stealing. This is because his meager salary was not enough to support his partner. Becoming unemployed, he lent himself money for a while, giving the bar as collateral; On one occasion, one of his creditors took him to the police station.

According to Luis Alberto Sánchez, around 1931 he was a street chocolate seller in Chosica. At that time he enrolled in the Aprista Party, attending the local branch in said town.

Then he rotated through various temporary jobs in Callao, La Punta and Miraflores, until he found a better job as a cook in an inn in Surquillo. One of the owners of that business was Alejandro Cortijo, an APRA who held party meetings at his premises, which Mendoza also attended. Intervened by the police, Mendoza was imprisoned on March 13, 1933, in the El Sexto Prison. He was released on April 4.

Once again unemployed, Mendoza was supported by his friends, who gave him housing, until he finally found refuge in the premises of the Graphic Federation, thanks to the protection of Pedro Catalino Lévano, who was the janitor of said premises. Mendoza spent the night there the night before the murder of Sánchez Cerro. It is also mentioned that he received advice from Leopoldo Pita, a lower-ranking APRA leader.

=== Assassination of Sánchez Cerro ===
On the morning of April 30, 1933, President Luis Miguel Sánchez Cerro reviewed the troops who were going to fight in the armed conflict with Colombia and who were gathered at the Santa Beatriz Hippodrome, today the Campo de Marte. After the ceremony, he retired in his open vehicle with an escort. Accompanying him inside the vehicle were Prime Minister José Matías Manzanilla, Chief of Military Staff Antonio Rodríguez Ramírez and his aide-de-camp, Major Eleazar Atencio. Sánchez Cerro sat in the back seat of the car, on the right side, while Manzanilla was to his left. Rodríguez and Atencio were in the front seats, in addition to the pilot. Next to it was a horse escort and followed by another car, where the members of the Military Staff were riding. The vehicle moved slowly, in the middle of the crowd, at the request of the president himself, who wanted to avoid any accidents.

It was in that circumstance when Abelardo Mendoza Leyva, armed with a Browning brand automatic pistol, crossed the line of gendarmes, rushed towards the presidential car, and holding onto the hood, fired several shots at the president in the back. The driver accelerated the car, throwing Mendoza to the ground, who was instantly shot by the members of the presidential escort who were closely following the car and by the members of the Military House who were in another car, a few metres away. behind the one carrying the president. Even some soldiers from the escort pierced him with their spears. The autopsy protocol determined that Mendoza's body had 20 gunshot wounds caused by thirteen projectiles, and 4 spear wounds that destroyed a lung, liver and intestines. The weapon used by Mendoza was picked up by an individual named Ángel Millán Ramos, who took it with him, although a witness identified him, and he was captured and involved in the crime.

== See also ==
- Luis Miguel Sánchez Cerro

== Bibliography ==
- Basadre, Jorge (2005). Historia de la República del Perú 8.º periodo: El comienzo de la irrupción de las masas organizadas en la política (1930-1933) (in Spanish). Vol. 16 (9th ed.). Lima: Empresa Editora El Comercio S. A. ISBN 9972-205-78-9.
- Chanduví, Luis (1988). El Apra por dentro. Lo que hice, lo que ví, y lo que sé (1931-1957) (in Spanish) (1st ed.). Lima: Taller Gráfico “Copias e Impresiones”.
- Sánchez, Luis Alberto (1985). Haya de la Torre y el Apra (in Spanish) (3rd ed.). Lima: Editorial Universo S.A.
- Basadre Grohmann, Jorge (2014). Historia de la República del Perú [1822–1933] (in Spanish). Vol. 15–16. Lima: Producciones Cantabria S.A.C. ISBN 978-612-306-353-5.
