= Battle of Güepí =

Battle of the Colombia–Peru War

- Part of the Colombia–Peru War
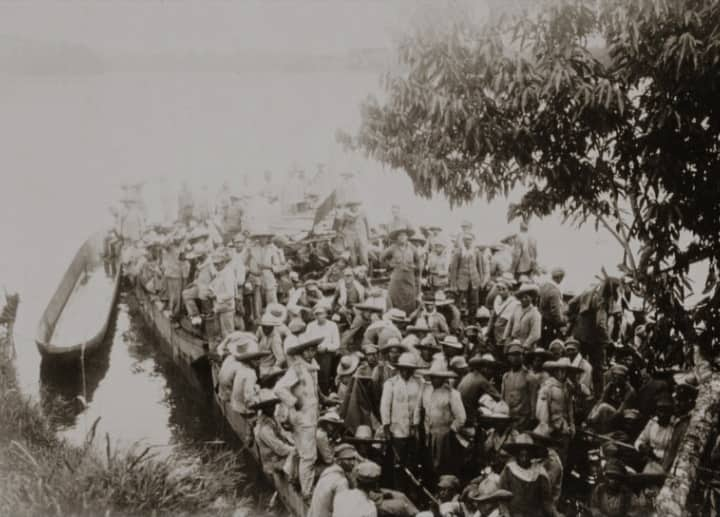
- Colombian troops preparing to land in Güepí
| Date | 26 March 1933 |
| Location | Gueppi (today part of Putumayo Province in Loreto Department in Peru) |
| Result | Colombian victory |
| Territorial changes | Colombia occupies Gueppi |

Belligerents
| Colombia | Peru |

Commanders and leaders
| José Dolores Solano | José Víctor Tenorio; Teodoro Garrido Lecca |

Units involved
| Putumayo Detachment; Amazonas Detachment | Gueppi Garrison |

Strength
| 2 warships 2 gunboats Several aircraft 1 company Total: 1,550 men | 190 men Several aircraft |

Casualties and losses
| 26 March: 16 killed 13 wounded 28 March: 1 helmsman killed | 26 March: 27 killed 12 wounded 19 captured 10 April: 3 killed |

The Battle of Güepí was a military confrontation that occurred on March 26, 1933, during the Colombia–Peru War.

== Background ==
After the Battle of Tarapacá, the Colombian high command considered it important to fulfill two specific objectives in the Putumayo River: the occupation of Güepí in upper Putumayo, and Puerto Arturo in lower Putumayo. Güepí was chosen due to its weaker position and because its capture would allow the total domination of the upper Putumayo, ensuring the communications would continue with Puerto Asís, and freeing Puerto Leguízamo from threats from the west.

== Battle ==
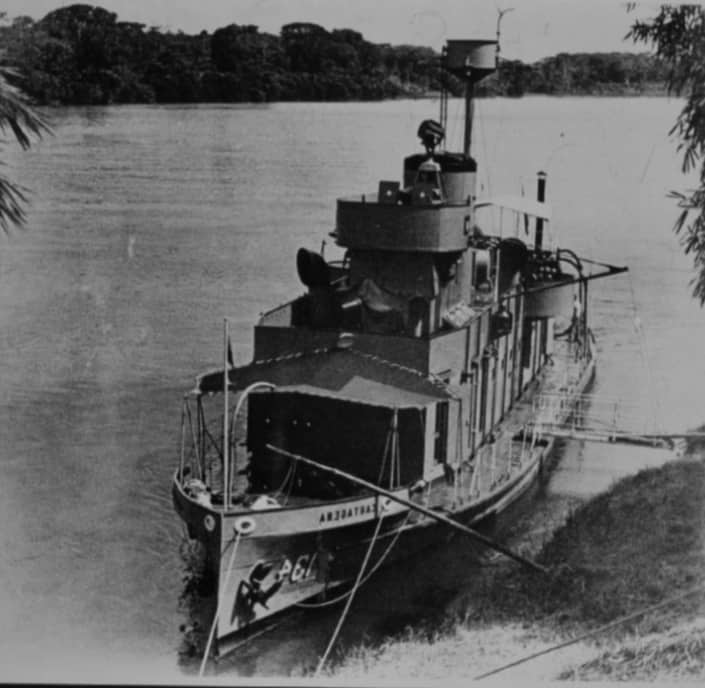
Colombian ship ARC Cartagena after the landing at Gueppi.

The events prior to the combat began at two in the morning on March 26, 1933, when the ships Cartagena' and Santa Marta of the Putumayo Detachment of the Colombian Navy landed two contingents of the Colombian Army on both flanks of Güepí in order to surround the fort where the Peruvian Army was located. Around 9 in the morning of the same day the Colombian Air Force began the attack, supported by artillery fire from nearby Chavaco Island and from the gunboats Cartagena and Santa Marta, such that by 9:50 the Colombian company that was advancing from the east occupied the Bolognesi entrenchment, when the Peruvian lieutenant Sillau abandoned it before his imminent fall.

While this was happening on land, in the water, the ship Cartagena advanced towards the mouth of the Güepí River, beating the fort that defended that position with its cannons. Towards 12 o'clock the Cartagena launched itself towards the riverbank to disembark a wave of soldiers in order to take the main nest of resistance; Downstream, the Santa Marta fulfilled a similar task.

The Peruvian troops resisted throughout the assault, slowly giving up ground, however, seeing themselves completely outflanked and only the trail to the town of Cabo Pantoja as a single supply route, they withdrew in a disorderly manner, abandoning wounded, weapons, ammunition and food; Simultaneously the Peruvian aircraft withdrew towards Pantoja. Some Colombian platoons tried to follow the Peruvians in retreat, but when night fell and they did not know this territory, the pursuit was called off.

At the end of the day, the casualties were 16 dead and 13 wounded for the Colombian side, while for the Peruvian side there were 27 dead, 12 wounded and 13 prisoners, a number that would increase in the following days to 19, with 6 new prisoners; as well as the permanence of the Colombian troops in Güepí.

On March 28, the Peruvian air force conducted an attack on Güepí, which had no major impact. Towards the west, the Sinchi Roca boat that was transporting the 19 Peruvian prisoners was located, and the Peruvian forces attacked it, forcing it to run aground on the low shore; only the helmsman of the Colombian vessel perished and the Peruvians were released. After that, a series of skirmishes followed in the attempt of the Peruvians to recover Güepí. The main one of these took place on April 10, 1933, when a sergeant and two Peruvian soldiers died in a clash with the Colombian outposts.
