= Amazon Trapeze =

Region in Amazonas Department, Colombia

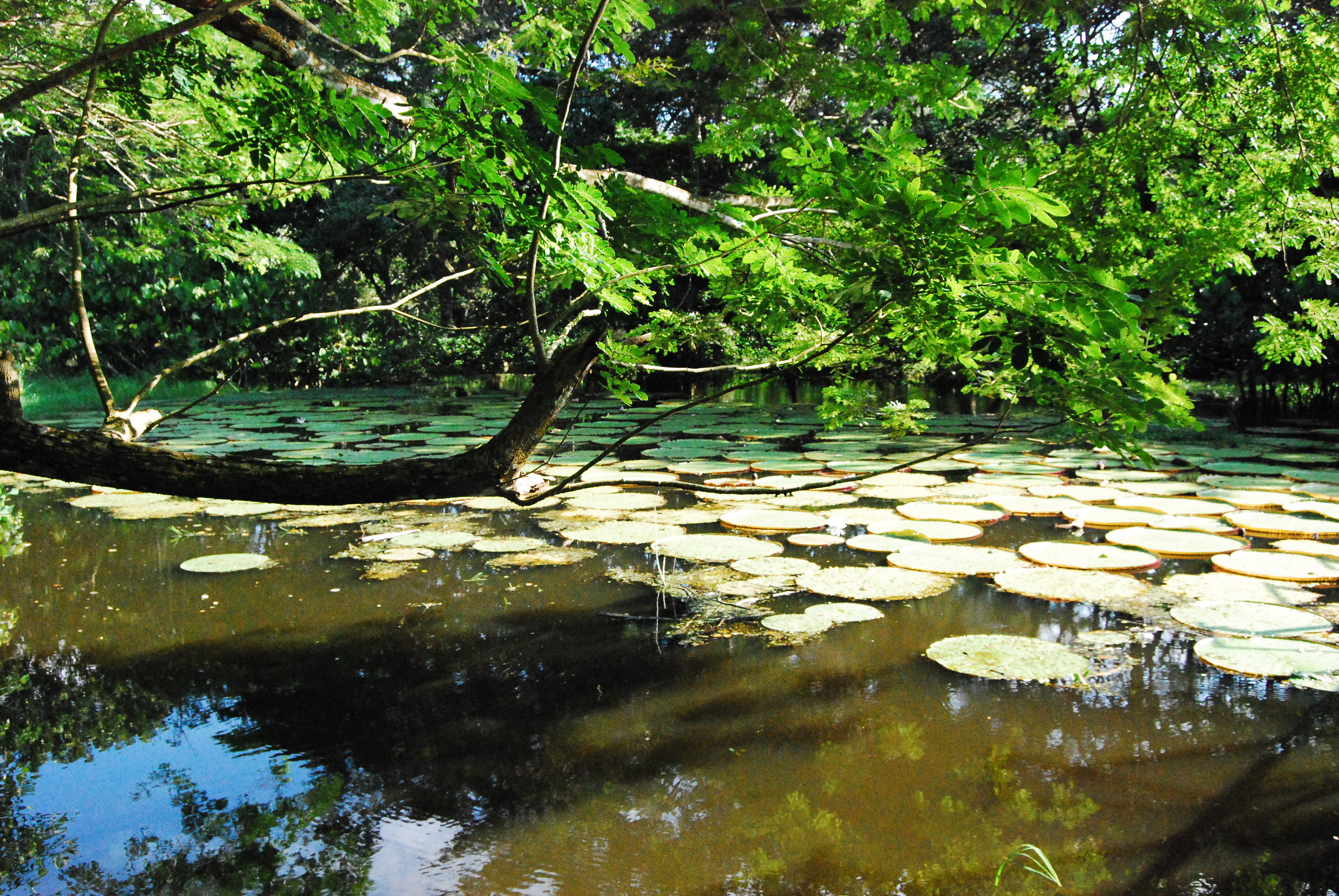
River near Leticia.

The Amazonian Trapeze, or Leticia Trapeze, is a geographical corridor located in the far south of the Amazonas Department of Colombia, which is the southernmost part of the country and allows it to have banks on the Amazon River. At the end of the department, which extends like a peninsula between Brazil and Peru, is the departmental capital of Leticia.

== Location ==
The Amazon Trapeze, which emerges from a vaster territory to the north, is one of two parts of the Amazonas Department of Colombia. The Amazon Trapeze is located between the Putumayo River to the north and the Amazon River to the south and between the border with Brazil to the east and the border with Peru to the west. Thus, a trapezoidal strip of about 50 km in the Putumayo and 100 km in the Amazon and 150 km in length between both rivers is formed. The trapezoidal shape gives the name to this Colombian geographic arm.

The Amazon Trapeze is also the location of the Amacayacu National Park, which has a great wealth of fauna and flora and is one of the main objectives of national and international ecotourism.

== History ==
The trapeze was originally part of a larger disputed territory between Colombia and Peru through which the former sought a direct exit towards the Amazon River. During its territorial dispute, the Peruvian government in the town of Leticia established the Colony of Leticia, also known as the Colony of San Antonio, a project through which the area would be inhabited by Peruvian citizens and thus oppose Colombian claims over the territory.

The region's current borders came into existence as a result of the Salomón–Lozano Treaty, which was signed between Colombia and Peru in 1922, established the modern Colombia–Peru border, and ended a long dispute that had existed since the independence of both countries. Local dissatisfaction with the treaty, however, led to the Colombia–Peru War in 1932, the last conflict between both countries.

Once hostilities between both states had finally ended, the first arrival of Colombian settlers took place in 1930.

== Human settlements ==
The Colombian towns of Leticia (capital of the department of Amazonas) and Puerto Nariño, both on the banks of the Amazon River, and the city of Tarapacá, on the banks of the Putumayo River, are all in the Trapeze. Also, the region has protected indigenous settlements.

== See also ==
- Tres Fronteras
- Colombia–Peru War
- Sucumbíos Triangle
