= Sucumbíos Triangle =

Region of Ecuador

Sucumbíos Triangle Triángulo de Sucumbíos
- Former exclave of Peru
- 1922–1942
- Flag Coat of arms

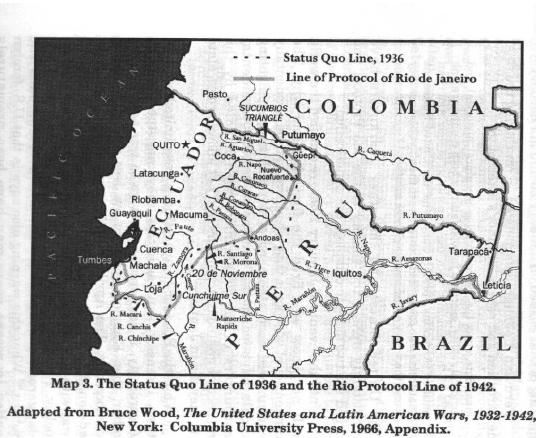
- Status quo border between Peru and Ecuador in 1936, with the Sucumbíos Triangle at the top.

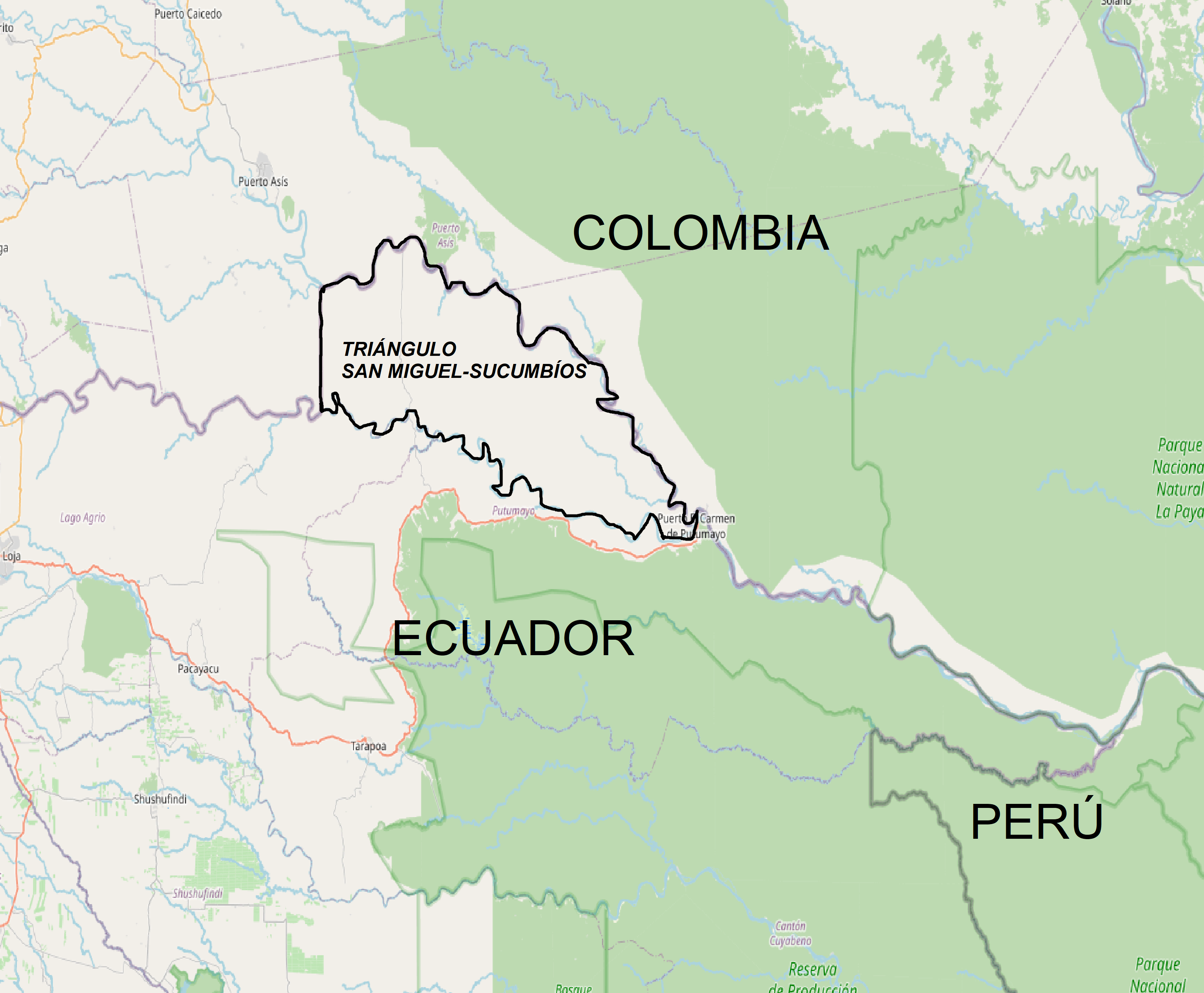
- Zoomed map of the San Miguel-Sucumbíos triangle.
- Historical era: Republican Era
  - Salomón-Lozano Treaty: 24 March 1922
  - Colombia–Peru War: 1932
  - Ecuador–Peru War: 1941
  - Rio de Janeiro Protocol: 29 January 1942
Preceded by	Succeeded by
Colombia	Ecuador
- Today part of: Ecuador

The Sucumbíos Triangle (Note: Also known as the San Miguel-Sucumbíos Triangle (Spanish: Triángulo San Miguel-Sucumbíos), Cuembi Triangle (Spanish: Triángulo de Cuembi) or Cuhimbe Triangle (Spanish: Triángulo de Cuhimbe)) (Spanish: Triángulo de Sucumbíos) is a territorial zone in Ecuador, located between the Putumayo River to the north and the San Miguel River to the south. It belonged to Peru as a de jure exclave between 1922 and 1942, when it was ceded to Ecuador as a result of the Rio de Janeiro Protocol, and is now part of its border with Colombia.

== History ==
After the signing of the Salomón-Lozano Treaty in 1922, Colombia and Peru officially established their borders and exchanged strategic territories. Colombia obtained an entrance to the Amazon River through the Amazon Trapeze, and Peru de jure obtained a strategic exclave between the Putumayo and the San Miguel Rivers. Although it had ceded the territory to Colombia in 1916, the Ecuadorian government did not recognize the act since both signatory countries also had territorial disputes with Ecuador.

After the Leticia Incident of 1932 and the Colombia–Peru War, the Protocol of Rio de Janeiro of 1934 was negotiated in which Colombia and Peru agreed that the borders would remain as had been agreed in 1922. Colombia made it clear that it recognized Peruvian sovereignty over the Sucumbíos Triangle.

In 1933, after the failure of the only serious attempt to colonize the triangle, the Peruvian diplomats Víctor Manuel Maúrtua, Víctor Andrés Belaúnde, Alberto Ulloa Sotomayor and Raúl Porras Barrenechea tried to reach an agreement with their Colombian counterparts so that the Sucumbíos Triangle would return to Colombian sovereignty and the Amazon Trapeze to Peruvian sovereignty. The attempt did not succeed, and Peru continued to claim the uncontrolled territory.

=== Rio de Janeiro Protocol ===
Peru and Ecuador still maintained a territorial conflict, which escalated into the Ecuadorian–Peruvian War of 1941. During the conflict, Ecuador maintained control of the Sucumbíos Triangle, as well as the territories on its side of the de facto border of 1936. During the negotiations after the war for the Rio de Janeiro Protocol, Peru granted the triangle to Ecuador, in addition to its other claims in the upper Napo River, in exchange for other territories, as well as recognition of Peruvian sovereignty in Tumbes, Jaén, and Maynas. The oil-rich region proved extremely beneficial to Ecuador in the long run, as it contributed to its economy and a national reconstruction program started after the war.

== See also ==
- Amazon Trapeze
- Ecuadorian–Peruvian territorial dispute
- Ecuador–Peru border
