= Igara Paraná River =

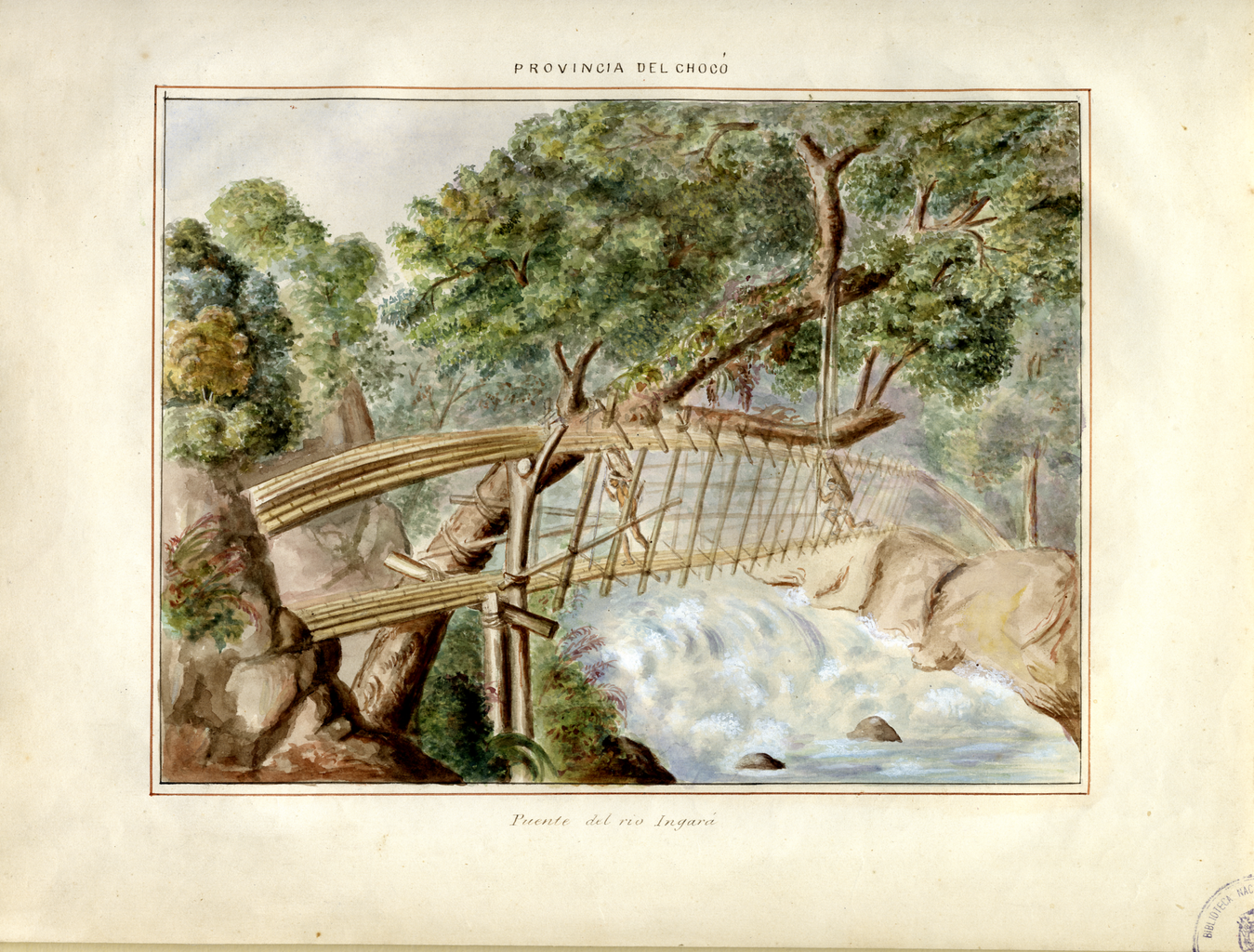

Location
- Country: Colombia

Physical characteristics
- Mouth: Putumayo River
  - location
  - coordinates: 2°10′13″S 71°46′34″W
- Length: 430 km (270 mi)
- Basin size: 12,945 km2

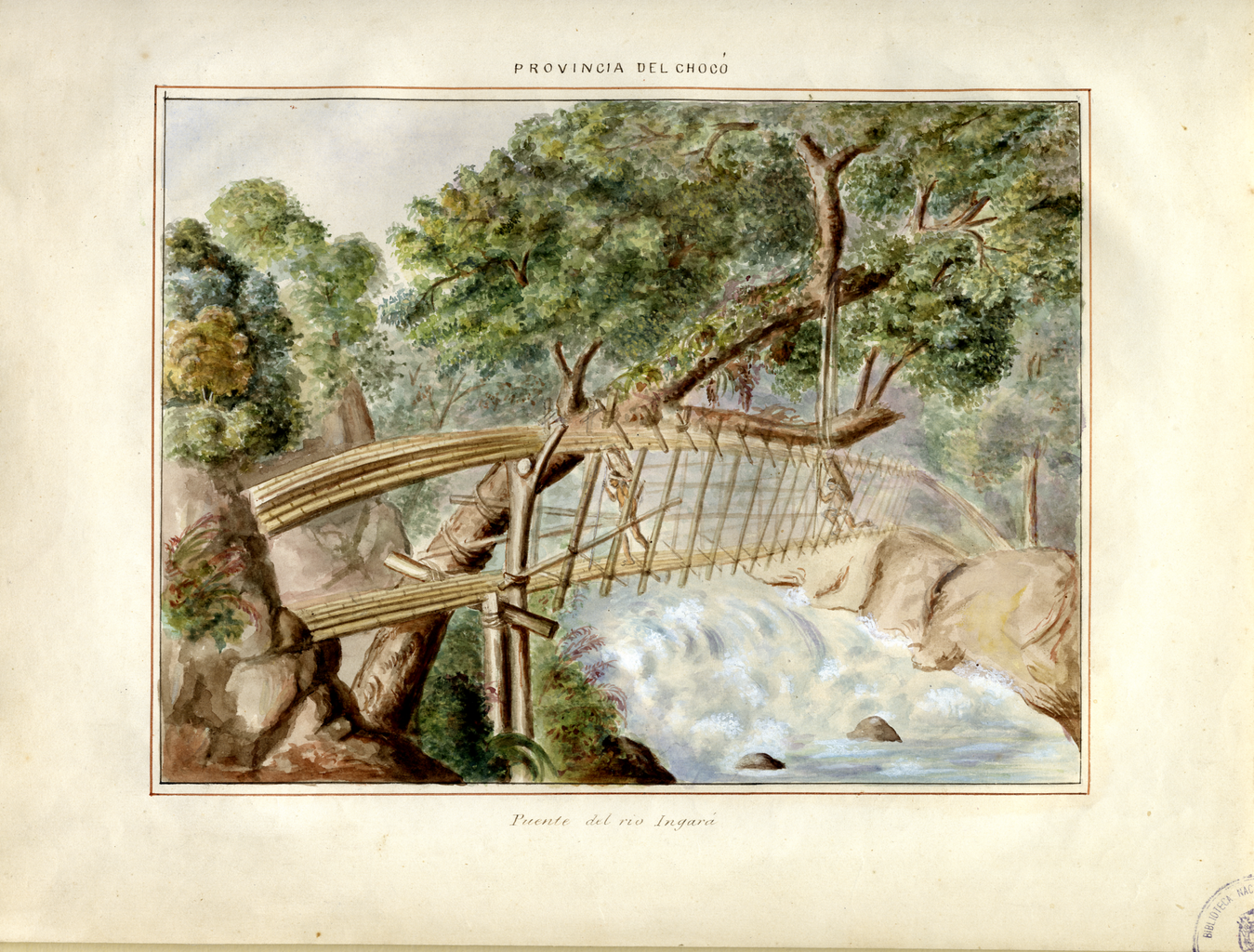

Igara Paraná River (Spanish pronunciation: [iˈɣaɾa paɾaˈna]) is a river of Colombia. It is part of the Amazon River basin and a right-bank tributary of the Putumayo River.

== See also ==
- List of rivers of Colombia
