= Pureté River =

Location
- Country: Brazil

Physical characteristics
- Source
  - location: Amazonas state
- Mouth
  - coordinates: 3°1′S 69°2′W

Pureté River is a river of Amazonas state in north-western Brazil. The 322-km Pureté is a tributary of the Putumayo River.

== See also ==
- List of rivers of Amazonas
