= Puerto Asís =

Coordinates: 0°31′N 76°30′W

- Municipality and city
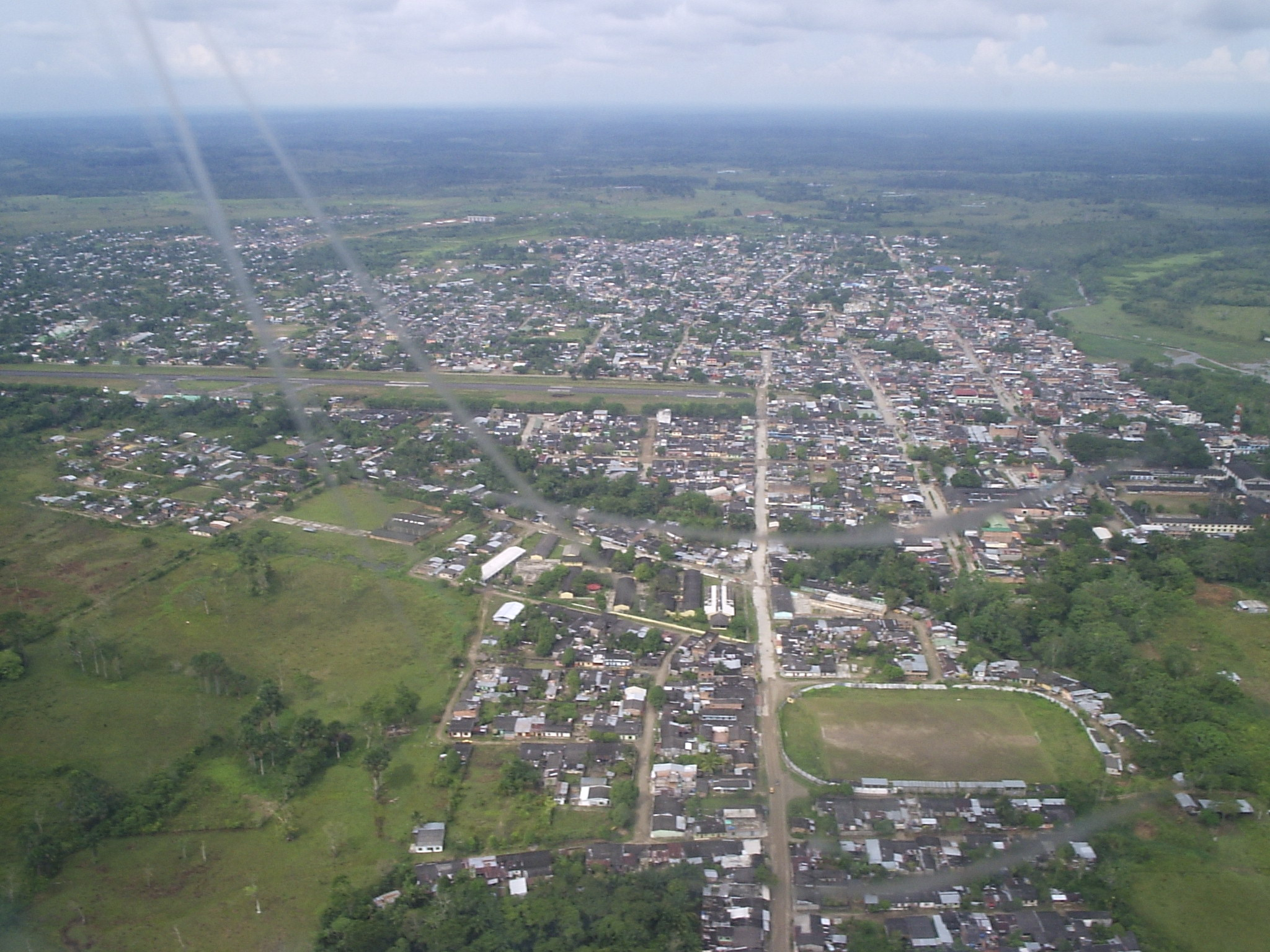
- Aerial view of Puerto Asis

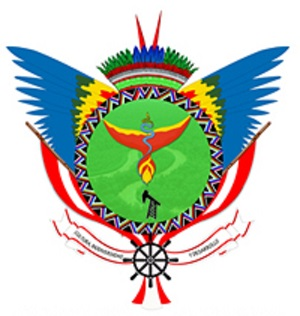
- Flag Coat of arms

- Location of the city of Puerto Asís in the Putumayo Department.
- Country: Colombia
- Department: Putumayo Department

Government
  - Mayor: Fernando Castillo

Area
  - Municipality and city: 2,819 km^{2} (1,088 sq mi)
  - Urban: 5.63 km^{2} (2.17 sq mi)
- Elevation: 250 m (820 ft)

Population (2020 est.)
  - Municipality and city: 67,211
  - Density: 23.84/km^{2} (61.75/sq mi)
  - Urban: 40,549
  - Urban density: 7,200/km^{2} (18,700/sq mi)
- Time zone: UTC-5
- Website: Government of Puerto Asis official website

Puerto Asís (Spanish pronunciation: [ˈpweɾto aˈsis]) is a Colombian municipality and city in Putumayo Department. It is located on the west bank of the Putumayo River, downstream from the mouth of the Guamués River, 75 km (47 mi) south of (Cardinal) Mocoa. Bordering Ecuador, Puerto Asís municipality is the most populous municipality of the department, with a population of 67,211.

== History ==
Puerto Asís was founded on May 3, 1912, by the Capuchins Missionaries, led by Father Estanislao de las Cortes and Brother Hidelfonso de Tulcán. The city bears the name of Saint Francis's birthplace—Assisi.

In order to reaffirm the sovereignty of Colombia in the territories that were contested by Peru, the government located programs in the region that contributed to the town's growth.

By April 1914, the village had a population of more than 200; however, excluding children, women, or indigenous people. The population continued to increase. The mission opened a boarding school for the education of the local indigenous population and the colonists' children. Later that same year, The Franciscan Sisters took charge of the school.

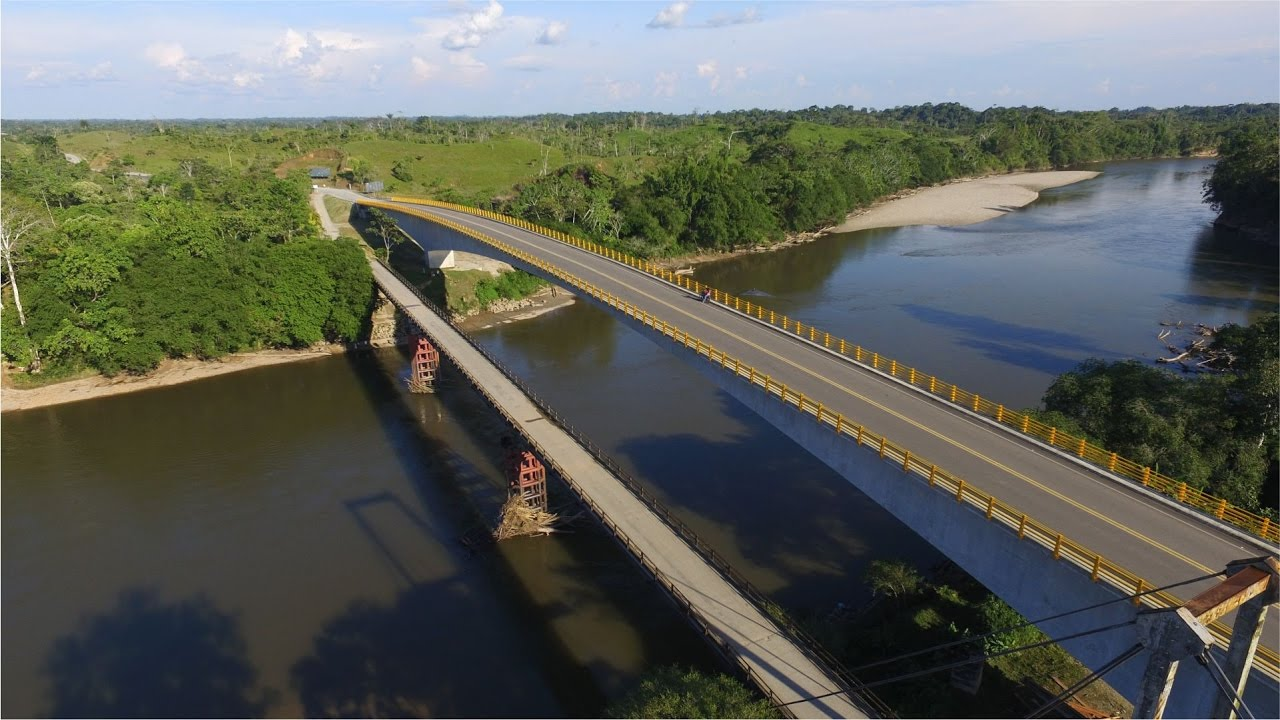
Puente El Ferry

The city celebrates Carnival each year in January, beginning with a Tyre Regatta on January 3 in the Putumayo River. This became a major tourist attraction.

== Climate ==
Puerto Asís has a tropical rainforest climate (Af) with heavy to very heavy rainfall year-round.

Climate data for Puerto Asís
Month	Jan	Feb	Mar	Apr	May	Jun	Jul	Aug	Sep	Oct	Nov	Dec	Year
Mean daily maximum °C (°F)	30.2 (86.4)	29.7 (85.5)	29.3 (84.7)	29.0 (84.2)	28.6 (83.5)	28.8 (83.8)	28.5 (83.3)	29.4 (84.9)	30.1 (86.2)	30.8 (87.4)	30.8 (87.4)	30.8 (87.4)	29.7 (85.4)
Daily mean °C (°F)	25.1 (77.2)	24.8 (76.6)	24.6 (76.3)	24.4 (75.9)	24.1 (75.4)	24.4 (75.9)	24.2 (75.6)	24.5 (76.1)	25.1 (77.2)	25.6 (78.1)	25.7 (78.3)	25.8 (78.4)	24.9 (76.8)
Mean daily minimum °C (°F)	20.0 (68.0)	20.0 (68.0)	20.0 (68.0)	19.9 (67.8)	19.7 (67.5)	20.1 (68.2)	19.9 (67.8)	19.7 (67.5)	20.2 (68.4)	20.5 (68.9)	20.7 (69.3)	20.8 (69.4)	20.1 (68.2)
Average rainfall mm (inches)	217 (8.5)	217 (8.5)	370 (14.6)	409 (16.1)	417 (16.4)	381 (15.0)	318 (12.5)	223 (8.8)	322 (12.7)	384 (15.1)	337 (13.3)	265 (10.4)	3,860 (151.9)
Source: Climate-Data.org

== Culture ==
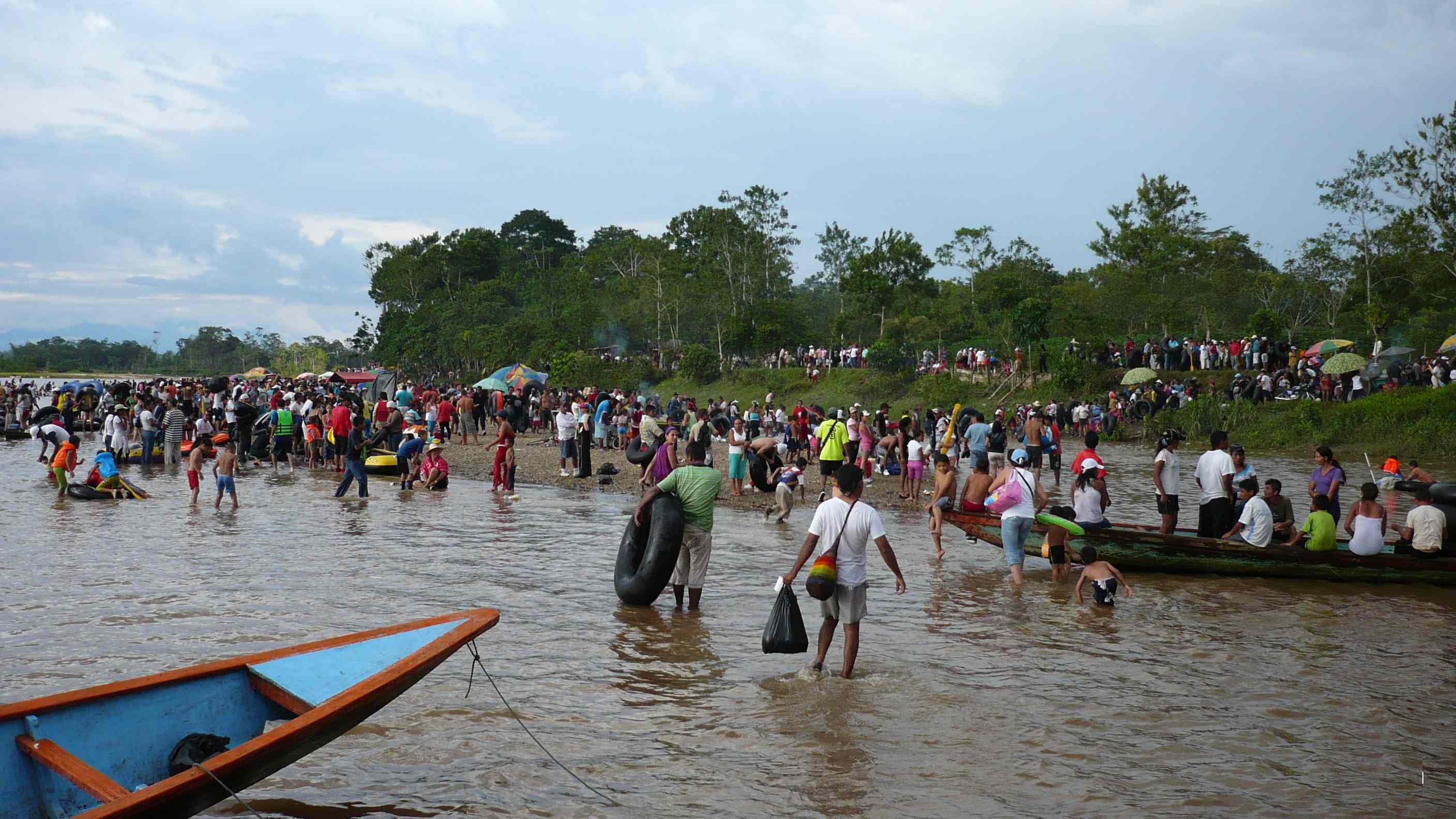
Boat racing in the Putumayo River

Each day of Carnival features a separate color. January 4 is multicolored; the 5th is black; the 6th is white and end with the coronation of the carnival queen on the 7th.

The town celebrates its founding on May 3.

The Puerto Asis fair has historically been recognized as ranch day. It includes horseback riding and livestock exhibitions.
