= Luis Miguel Sánchez Cerro =

Peruvian politician (1889–1933)

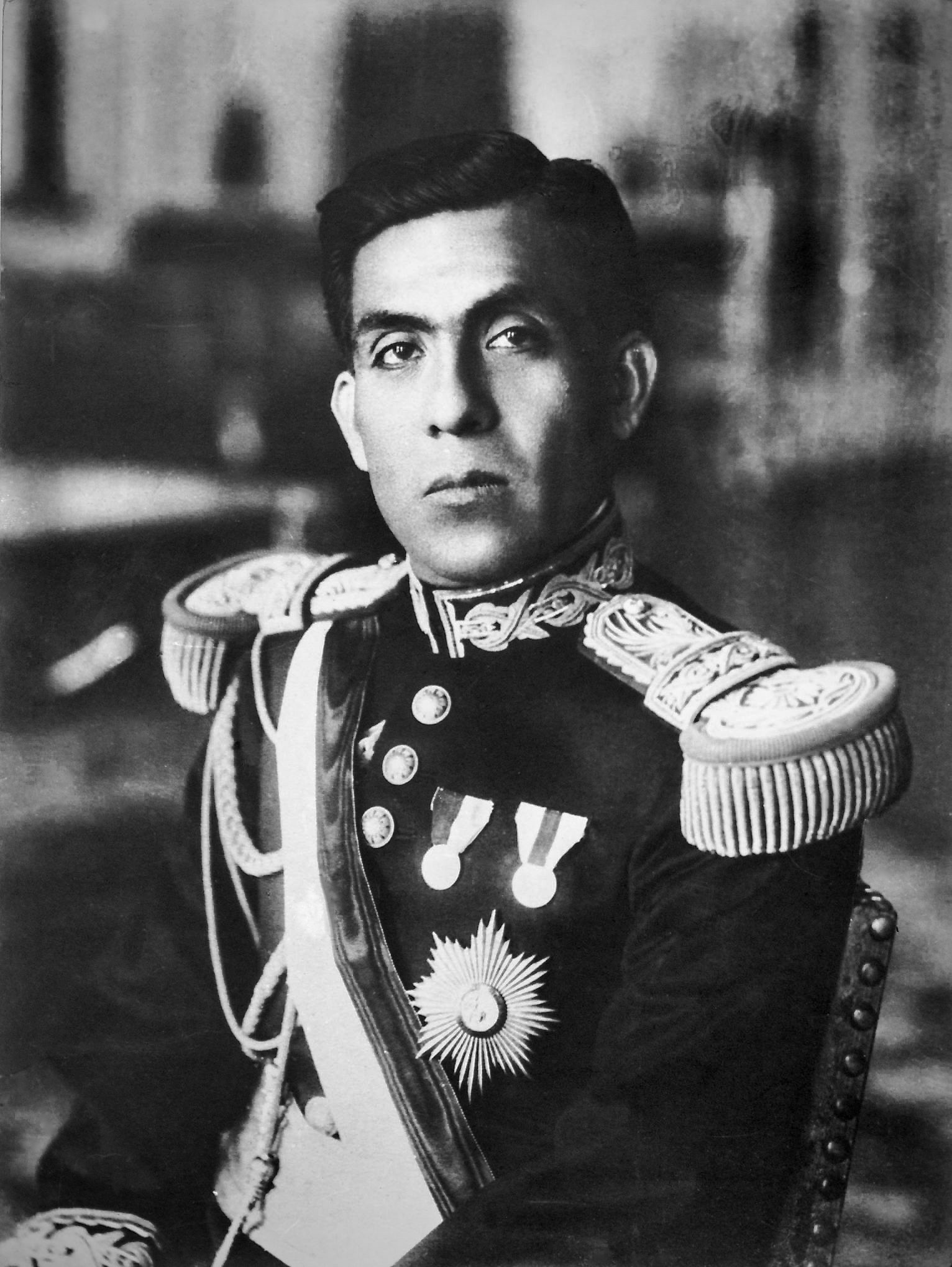
- Cerro c. 1930

President of Peru
- In office December 8, 1931 – April 30, 1933
- Prime Minister: Germán Arenas y Loayza; Francisco Lanatta; Luis A. Flores; Ricardo Rivadeneyra; Carlos Zavala Loayza; José Matías Manzanilla
- Preceded by: David Samanez
- Succeeded by: Óscar R. Benavides

President of the Military Government Junta of Peru
- In office August 27, 1930 – March 1, 1931
- Prime Minister: Luis Miguel Sánchez Cerro; Antonio Beingolea
- Preceded by: Manuel Ponce
- Succeeded by: Ricardo Leoncio Elías

Prime Minister of Peru
- In office August 28, 1930 – November 24, 1930
- President: Manuel María Ponce Brousset; Luis Miguel Sánchez Cerro
- Preceded by: Fernando Sarmiento
- Succeeded by: Antonio Beingolea

Personal details
- Born: August 12, 1889 Piura, Peru
- Died: April 30, 1933 (aged 43) Lima, Peru
- Cause of death: Assassination
- Party: Revolutionary Union
- Education: San Miguel de Piura School; Chorrillos Military School; Saint-Cyr Military School

Military service
- Allegiance: Peru
- Branch/service: Peruvian Army (Spain) Spanish Army
- Years of service: 1910–1930
- Rank: General
- Unit: Spanish Foreign Legion
- Battles/wars: 1914 Peruvian coup d'état (WIA); 1915 Puno Rebellion; 1922 Peruvian coup d'état attempt (WIA); Rif War (WIA) (Note: Disputed by Peruvian historian Jorge Basadre.); 1930 Peruvian coup d'état Colombia–Peru War X

Luis Miguel Sánchez Cerro (August 12, 1889 – April 30, 1933) was a high-ranking Peruvian army officer, revolutionary, nationalist and politician who served as the 41st President of Peru, from 1931 to 1933 as well as interim president of Peru, officially as the president of the Provisional Government Junta, from 1930 to 1931. On August 22, 1930, as a lieutenant-colonel, he overturned the eleven-year dictatorship of Augusto B. Leguía after a coup d'état in Arequipa.

Following Leguía's resignation, Manuel Ponce was interim president until Sánchez was chosen on August 27. The new president flew to Lima and himself served as provisional president until the military with whom he had effected the coup forced him into exile after six months in office.

Having experienced multiple assassination attempts and coup attempts during his time in power, he was ultimately assassinated on April 30, 1933 by Abelardo de Mendoza, a member of the suppressed APRA Party.

== Early life ==
Luis Miguel Sánchez Cerro was born in Piura on August 12, 1889, to Antonio Sánchez and Rosa Cerro. Of Mestizo descent, he allegedly also had African ancestry through enslaved Malagasy ancestors in Piura.

== Early career ==
Luis Miguel Sánchez was wounded in five places and lost three fingers of his left hand when he seized the spitting muzzle of a machine gun (with his bare hands) and turned it against government forces during the overthrowing of President Guillermo Billinghurst, in 1914.

In 1921 he was again shot and injured when captured in Lima, in an unsuccessful attempt to overthrow President Leguía. During his exile abroad he served with the Spanish Foreign Legion in Morocco, where he was wounded. He got a post at the ministry of war in 1924. He also served with the Royal Army of Italy in 1925, and took advanced military studies in France in 1926.

He was permitted to return in 1928 by President Leguía.

== President of the junta (1930-1931) ==
In 1931, as president of the military junta, Sánchez awarded Prince Edward VIII of Wales with Peru's Order of the Sun, and proceeded to escort the prince and his entourage in the voyage back to the United Kingdom. Sánchez was awarded in return with the Grand Cross of the Order of the British Empire.

After six months in office, prominent Peruvian Navy officers held talks with Colonel Sánchez, and told him that only a single regiment in Lima remained loyal to his regime. As a result of this, Sánchez resigned, stating that he "only wanted to save his country," and that he "had no political ambition." He subsequently went into exile, vowing to return at a later date to stand for election.

The Navy then selected Chief Justice Ricardo Leoncio Elías of Peru's Supreme Court as the new president of the Republic on March 1, 1931.

== President of Peru (1931-1933) ==
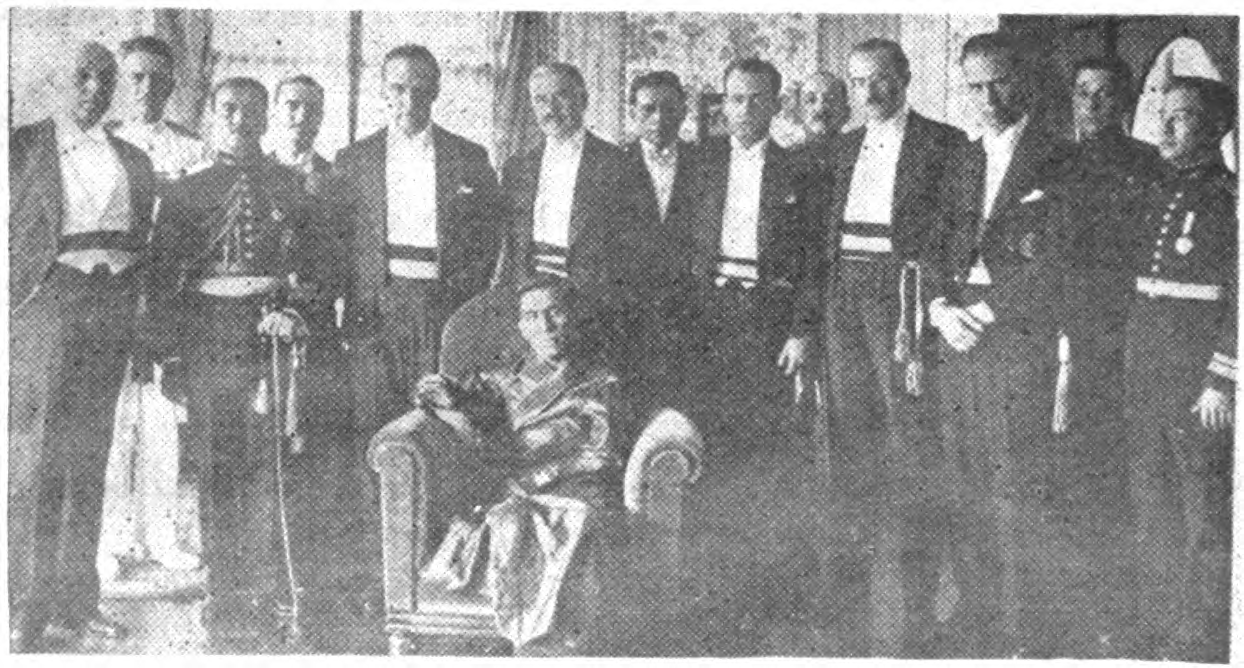
The Sánchez Cerro cabinet in 1932.

After Sanchez's resignation, Peru experienced political instability and economic problems. Sanchez returned to Peru on July 7, 1931 to be a candidate in the 1931 Peruvian general election.

In October 1931, the military Junta permitted a national election. Luis Sánchez was allowed to participate and won the elections by a majority of 19,745 votes, running as the candidate for the Revolutionary Union which he founded. President Luis M. Sánchez was inaugurated at Peru's Government Palace as the forty-fifth President of Peru. The results, however, were contested by the main opposition party, APRA.

After becoming president, Sánchez targeted perceived enemies in key institutions, including the military, civil service, unions and the legislature. His presidency was also marked by with conflict between APRA and the government. Leading to a 1932 uprising in Trujillo.

=== 1932 assassination attempt ===
In March 1932, as he was leaving Lima's socialite Church in Miraflores, an assassination attempt by an unknown individual – later identified as José Melgar – took place. Melgar attempted to shoot the president in the chest, but missed. The president himself was armed and almost shot his aggressor, but was stopped short of doing so by his bodyguards after they arrested the man.

Days after, the president commuted the death sentence of José Melgar to imprisonment for twenty-five years. He claimed that his "actions were entirely personal". The assassin claimed that his actions were not "politically motivated".

In June 1932, another revolt against President Sánchez took place in Huaraz. The President closed both the National College and the National University as "hotbeds of revolutions," and appealed for voluntary contributions to purchase three squadrons of bombing planes in order to put down further revolts.

== Conflict with Colombia ==
In September 1932, a group of Peruvian civilians and military dressed as civilians, staged a private raid and seized the Colombian town of Leticia. They then expelled the town's Colombian officials and demanded the support of the Peruvian Government. The surge of patriotism was too strong to be resisted by Sánchez.

By the Saloman-Lozano Treaty of 1922, Peru ceded to Colombia a "Corridor to the Amazon" at the tip of which is Leticia. However, the Treaty was kept in secret until the end of the Augusto B. Leguía dictatorship, and it was considered null and unequal by the new authorities under Sánchez.

By the end of September 1932, both Colombia and Peru were mobilizing men, money and munitions. In February 1933, at least three thousand Colombian troops with artillery and machine guns were deployed behind the Putumayo River, facing roughly equal Peruvian military forces. At Peru's Military Aviation School near Lima, President Sánchez approvingly inspected a brand new fleet of Douglas combat planes, just arrived from the United States.

The Council of the League of Nations sent Lima an important telegram, in which Peru was commanded by the Council "to refrain from any intervention by force on Colombian territory and ... not hinder the Colombian authorities from the exercise of full sovereignty and jurisdiction in territory recognized by a treaty to belong to Colombia."

== Assassination ==
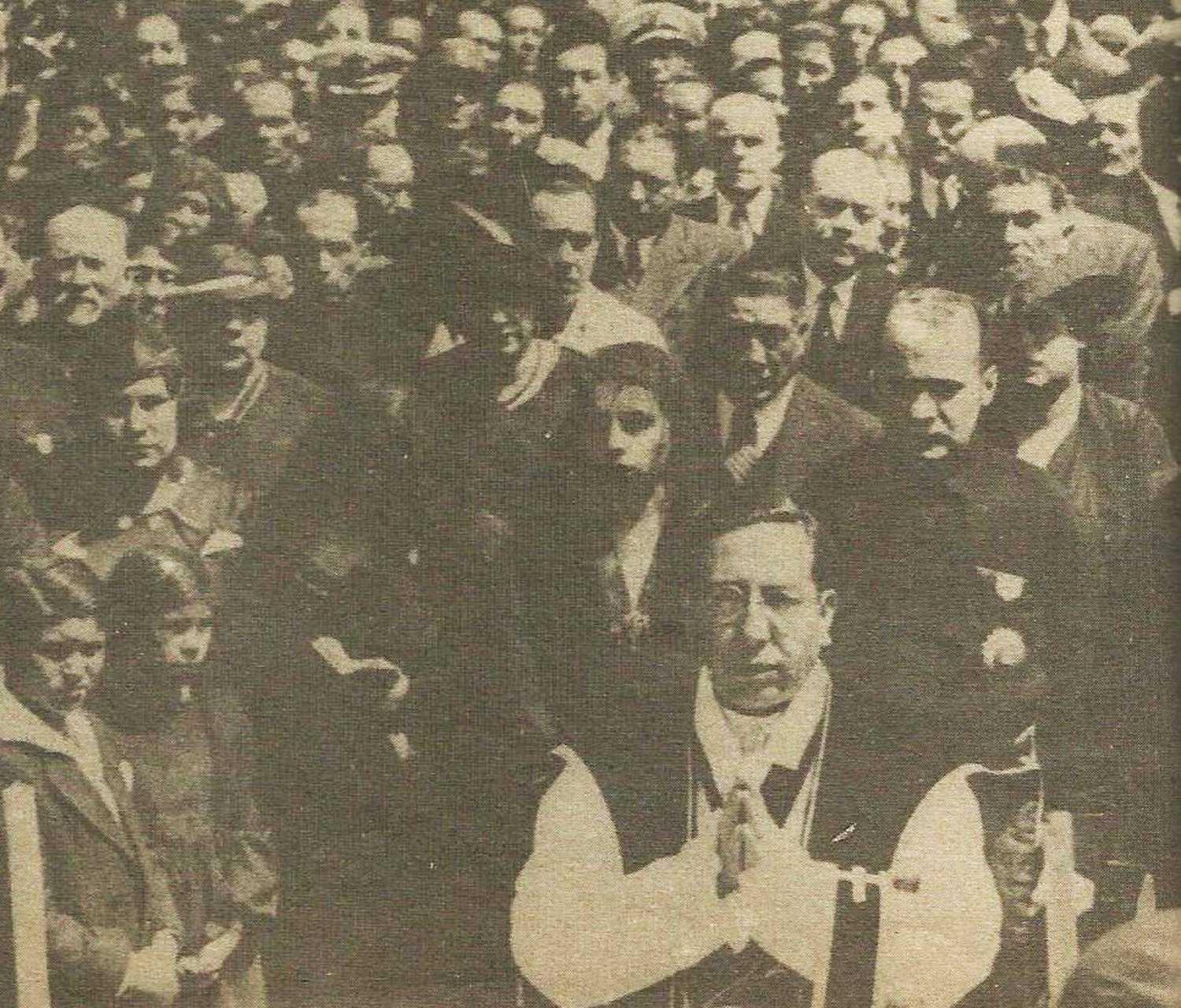
Pilgrimage by members of the Revolutionary Union to his tomb

On April 30, 1933, while at Santa Beatriz racetrack in Lima, President Sánchez had just finished reviewing twenty thousand young recruits for Peru's undeclared war with Colombia, when Abelardo de Mendoza, a member of the suppressed APRA Party, shot him through the heart.

Parliament proceeded to choose General Oscar R. Benavides to succeed Sánchez as Provisional President. Benavides had already served a term as Provisional President in 1914.

== Notes ==
Political offices
Preceded by Fernando Sarmiento	Prime Minister of Peru; 1930	Succeeded by Antonio Beingolea
Preceded by Manuel Ponce	Interim President of Peru (President of the Provisional Government Junta); August 1930 – March 1931	Succeeded by Ricardo Leoncio Elías
Preceded by David Samanez	President of Peru; December 1931 – April 1933	Succeeded by Oscar R. Benavides
