= Guamués River =

Coordinates: 3.0800°S 67.5800°W

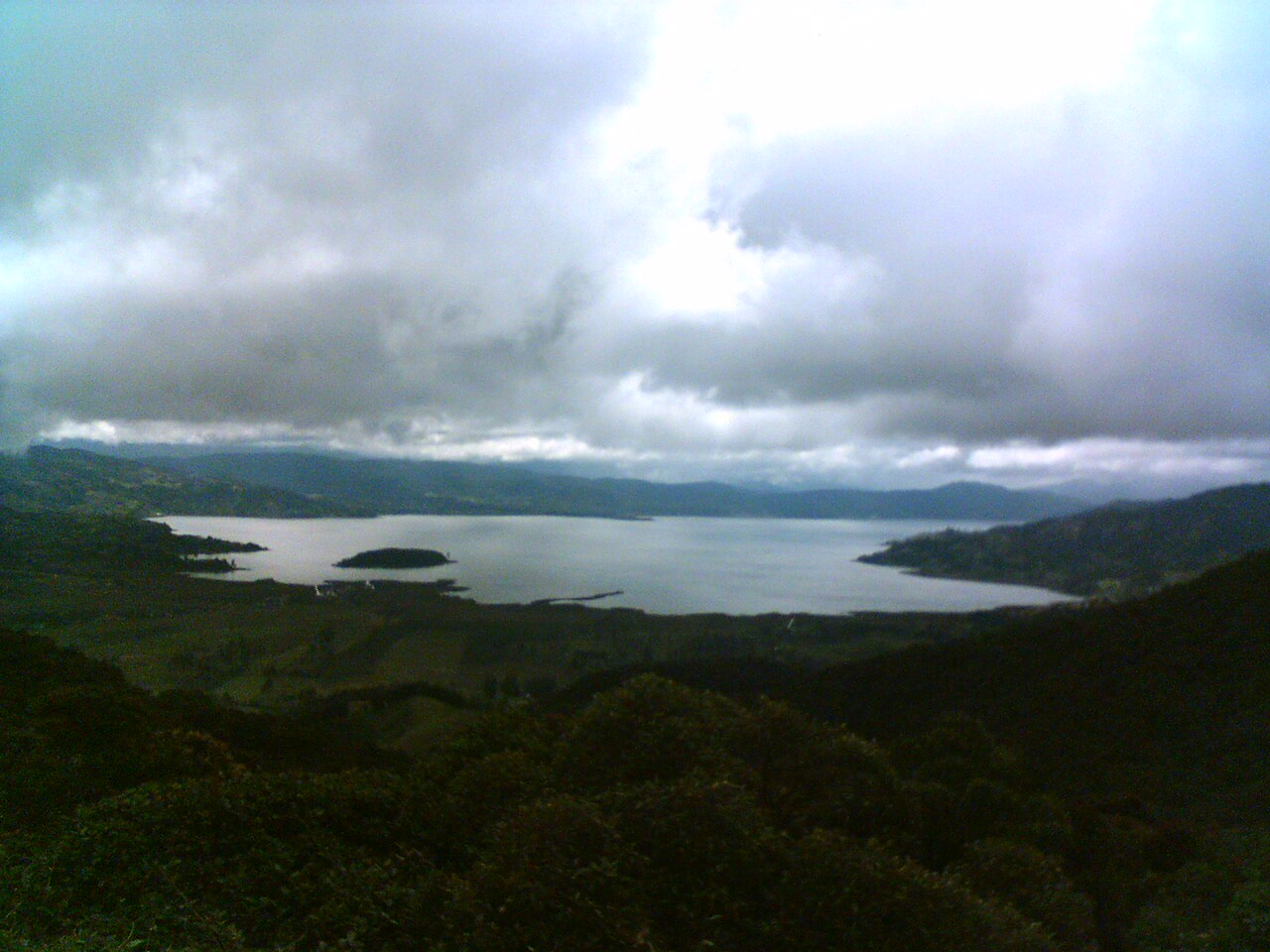

Location
- Country: Colombia

Guamués River is a river of Colombia. It is part of the Amazon River basin and a 140-km-long left tributary of the Putumayo River.

== See also ==
- List of rivers of Colombia
- Cofán tribe
