= Battle of Tarapacá (1933) =

Battle of the Colombia–Peru War

- Part of the Colombia–Peru War
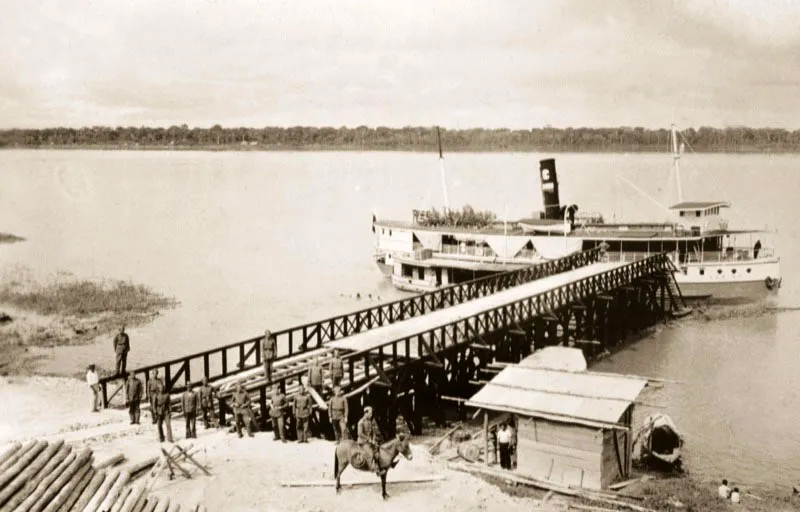
- Troops of the Colombian Army disembarking in Tarapacá after the escape of the troops of the Peruvian Army.
Date	14–15 February 1933
Location	Tarapacá, Amazonas Department, Colombia
Result	Colombian victory

Belligerents
Colombia	Peru

Commanders and leaders
Gen. Efraín Rojas; Gen. Alfredo Vásquez Cobo; Maj. Herbert Boy	Lt. Gonzalo Díaz

Units involved
Amazonas Detachment	Tarapacá Garrison

The Battle of Tarapacá, also known as the Battle of Nuevo Tarapacá or the Defense of the Lower Putumayo, took place during the Colombia–Peru War on February 14, 1933.

== Background ==
Before the skirmish took place, the Colombian high command discussed the strategy to take in the Amazonian conflict, choosing to take Tarapacá under General Efraín Rojas' suggestion, instead of Leticia, preferred by General Alfredo Vásquez Cobo.

After concentrating the ships that would make up the Amazonas Detachment in Belén do Pará, they proceeded to sail to the Brazilian town of Santo Antônio do Içá and from there divide the fleet into two: the warships Boyacá and Mosquera continued towards Leticia, while the ships Barranquilla, Córdova and Pichincha continued along the Putumayo River followed by the Nariño as a hospital ship; This maneuver sought to mislead the Peruvian commanders about the true intentions of the attack. Six seaplanes had joined the group under the command of Major Herbert Boy, while General Alfredo Vásquez Cobo went aboard the Córdova to request a meeting with the gunboats Cartagena and Santa Marta, which could not happen because the Putumayo Detachment was carrying out operations in the Güeppi area.

On February 11, 1933, General Alfredo Vásquez Cobo sent a speedboat to Tarapacá with an ultimatum in the hands of Lieutenant Jorge Hernández addressed to Lieutenant Gonzalo Díaz, commander of the Peruvian garrison. The Colombian emissary returned without a written response, but with a verbal response: Lieutenant Gonzalo Díaz stated that he would reject by force any attempted military occupation of Tarapacá.

== Battle ==
In the morning hours of February 14, the Córdova suffered an attack by a Peruvian air squadron, which provoked the response of the Colombian air squadron that was anchored nearby, without direct combat.

In the afternoon hours of February 14, Colombian forces advanced near Tarapacá to undertake the armed operation the following day. At six o'clock in the morning of February 15, the Colombian fleet began a bombardment as did the air force on the Peruvian garrisons, and three hours later the troops disembarked, which upon arriving at the fort found no trace of their Peruvian counterpart. Lieutenant Gonzalo Díaz had fled with his men at night through the Cotuhé River leaving behind supplies, ammunition and weapons, among them 2 Krupp 75mm cannons. Immediately after, General Alfredo Vásquez Cobo located a battalion of 300 men in Tarapacá and installed a support base there for subsequent operations.
