= Antonio Rodríguez Ramírez =

Peruvian military officer and politician

Antonio Rodríguez Ramírez (died February 19, 1939) was a Peruvian military officer and politician who served as Minister of Government and Police (1935-1939) and Second Vice President of the Republic (1936-1939) under General Óscar R. Benavides.

On 19 February 1939, as the result of a fake seance, Rodríguez Ramírez staged an unsuccessful coup d'état attempt against Benavides. Rodríguez Ramírez was shot and killed that same day.

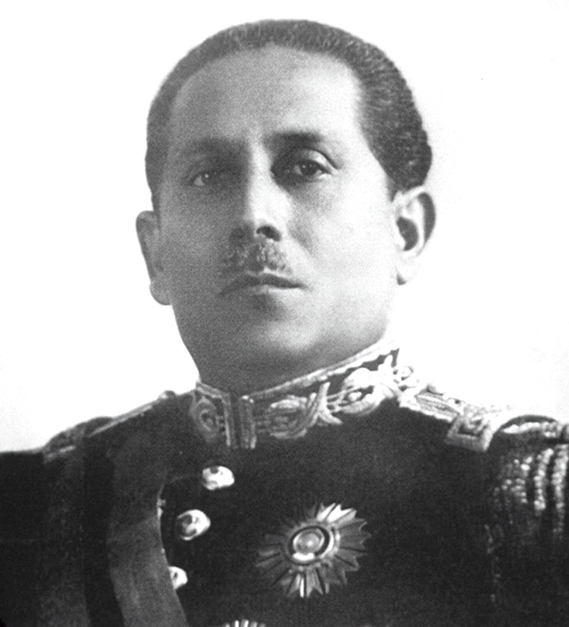
Antonio Rodriguez Ramirez

== Early life ==
Rodríguez Ramírez was born in Lima. His father served in the Peruvian military. Rodríguez Ramírez attended military school, where he was recognised as a top student.

When Luis Miguel Sánchez Cerro became President of Peru on December 8, 1931, Rodríguez Ramírez, then an army colonel, was appointed Chief of Staff of the military.

== Government career ==
In March 1932, assassins unsuccessfully attacked Sánchez Cerro in a church in Miraflores. During the attack, Rodríguez Ramírez was shot in the leg, leaving him permanently disabled. This injury gave him the nickname “el lajo Rodríguez”.

On April 30, 1933, Rodríguez Ramírez was in Sánchez Cerro's car when he was assassinated. Rodríguez Ramírez was unhurt and may have shot the assassin. When Benavides was appointed president by the Constituent Assembly, Rodríguez Ramírez became his ally. Benavides promoted him to general.

In 1935, Rodríguez Ramírez was appointed Minister of Government and Police. At that time, the Apristas, or supporters of American Popular Revolutionary Alliance and Communists were harshly persecuted. While serving in the post, Rodríguez Ramírez continued to repress them.

When Benavides, with the approval of the Constituent Assembly, restored the vice-presidencies (abolished since 1920), Rodríguez Ramírezwas appointed second vice-president of the Republic, for being the Minister of Government, while Ernesto Montagne Markholz was appointed First Vice President.

== Spiritualist plot ==
At the time, it was rumored that Rodríguez Ramírez was a Mason who also believed in astrology and spiritualism. After learning this, APRA leader Víctor Raúl Haya de la Torre introduced Manuel Cenzano, a medium, into Rodríguez Ramírez's spiritual session. A secret Aprista, Cenzano worked to influence Rodríguez Ramírez for the benefit of APRA.

Cenzano convinced Rodríguez Ramírez that he was invoking the "spirit" of Sánchez Cerro. According to Cenzano, the spirit wanted Rodríguez Ramírez to end the Benavides dictatorship and restore democracy. To carry out this purpose, the spirit said that he needed help from APRA. As a result of this deception, Rodríguez Ramírez met with Haya de la Torre.

By April 1938, with a promise of support from Haya de la Torre, Rodríguez Ramírez started planning a coup attempt. He enlisted the support of General Cirilo Ortega, head of the dissident groups of the Revolutionary Union, or the "Sanchecerista party".

== 1939 coup attempt ==
On February 19, 1939, Rodríguez Ramírez launched his coup attempt against Benavides. It was a Carnival Sunday in which Benavides was vacationing in Pisco.

Rodríguez Ramírez immediately occupied the Government Palace in Lima. Before the troops gathered in the courtyard, he was proclaimed acting head of the Republic. Rodríguez Ramírez immediately declared a general amnesty, called for a new Constituent Assembly and free elections.

However, later that day, the Assault Battalion of the Civil Guard of Peru, under Major GC Luis Rizo Patron Lembcke, reoccupied the palace. Rodríguez Ramírez was killed by a machine gun, ending the coup attempt.

== Aftermath ==
Rodríguez Ramírez's coup d'état reportedly failed due to a lack of support from other Army unit, important leaders or the general public. Despite their promises, the APRA failed to help him. .

Soon after the coup attempt, Benavides called for general elections.

== Bibliography ==
- Rodríguez, Raúl Palacios (2005). Historia de la República del Perú (PDF). Vol. 18. Empresa Editora El Comercio S. A. ISBN 9789972205804.
- Torres, Luis Chanduví (1988). El APRA por dentro: lo que hice, lo que vi, y lo que sé, 1931-1957 (in Spanish). Chanduví Torres.
- Chirinos, Enrique Soto (1985). Historia de la República: 1930-1985. AFA Editores Importadores.
- López Martínez, Héctor (2010): La República Contemporánea (1933-2010). Volume XII of “Historia del Perú” Empresa Editora El Comercio S.A. ISBN 978-612-4069-98-7
- Benavides de Pena, Paquita (1976) El Mariscal Benavides, su vida y su obra. Vol 1. Lima, Editorial Atlántida.
- Benavides de Pena, Paquita (1981) El Mariscal Benavides, su vida y su obra. Vol 2. Lima, Editorial Atlántida.
- La Revolución democrática del general Antonio Rodríguez Ramírez, 19 de febrero de 1939. 1942.
