= Cotuhé River =

Location
- Country: Colombia

Physical characteristics
- Mouth: Putumayo River
  - location: Tarapacá, Amazonas
  - coordinates: 2°53′40″S 69°44′03″W

Cotuhé River (Spanish pronunciation: [kotuˈe]) is a river of Peru and Colombia. It is part of the Amazon River basin and a left-bank tributary of the Putumayo River. The Cotuhé is 335 kilometers in length, with a basin size of 6,508.8 km^{2}.

== See also ==
- List of rivers of Colombia
