= Colombia–Peru War =

1932–33 border conflict

- Part of the Colombian–Peruvian territorial dispute
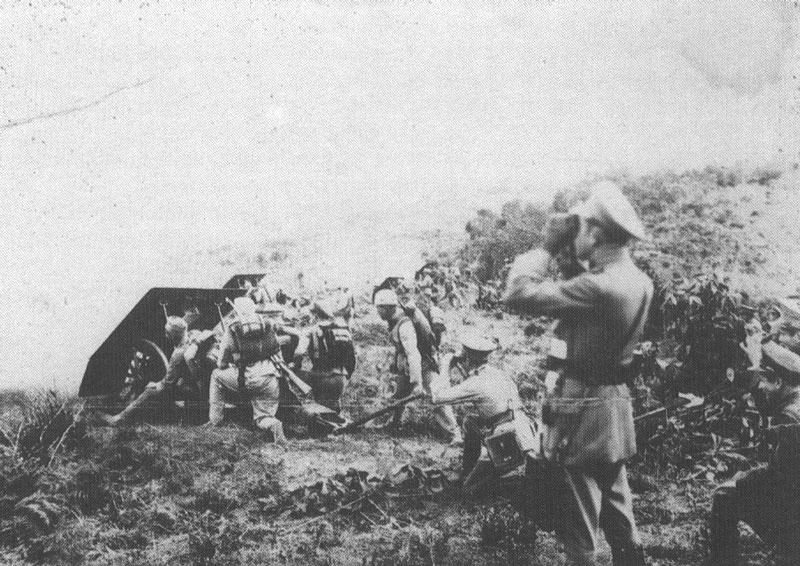
- Colombian Army on manoeuvres during the conflict.
Date	1 September 1932 – 24 May 1933 (8 months, 3 weeks and 2 days)
Location	Colombia
Result	Status quo ante bellum: Resolved by the League of Nations: Salomón–Lozano Treaty is upheld; Rio de Janeiro Protocol is signed
Territorial changes	Status quo ante bellum

Belligerents
Peru	Colombia

Commanders and leaders
(Peru) Luis Miguel Sánchez Cerro X (Peru) Óscar R. Benavides (Peru) Manuel E. Rodríguez (Peru) Antonio Beingolea Balarezo (Peru) Fernando Sarmiento Ramírez (Peru) Víctor Ramos	(Colombia) Enrique Olaya Herrera (Colombia) Alfredo Vásquez (Colombia) Carlos Uribe Gaviria (Colombia) Efraín Rojas Acevedo (Colombia) Roberto Domingo Rico Díaz (Colombia) Amadeo Rodríguez Vergara (Colombia) Manuel Balcázar

Units involved
V Division: 17th Mixed Infantry Regiment; 19th Mixed Infantry Regiment; 21st Artillery Battalion; 23rd Artillery Battalion; 25th Artillery Battalion; 27th Artillery Battalion; 1 sapper sector	III Military Division

Strength
457 troops (1932); 2 gunboats 3 transport ships 4 auxiliary launches 9 seaplanes	1700 troops (1932); 7 gunboats 3 transport ships 14 aircraft

Casualties and losses
40 combat casualties approx. 150–250 (mostly from jungle diseases)	40 combat casualties approx. 140–200 (mostly from jungle diseases)

The Colombia–Peru War, also called the Leticia War, was a short-lived armed conflict between Colombia and Peru over territory in the Amazon rainforest that lasted from September 1, 1932, to May 24, 1933. In the end, an agreement was reached to divide the disputed area between both countries.

The conflict was rooted in the Boundary Treaty of March 24, 1922, which transferred the Leticia district to Colombia, giving Colombia access to the Amazon river. The district was mostly inhabited by Peruvians, which fueled grievances among Peruvians and led them to seek to modify the treaty.

== Background ==
=== Civilian takeover ===
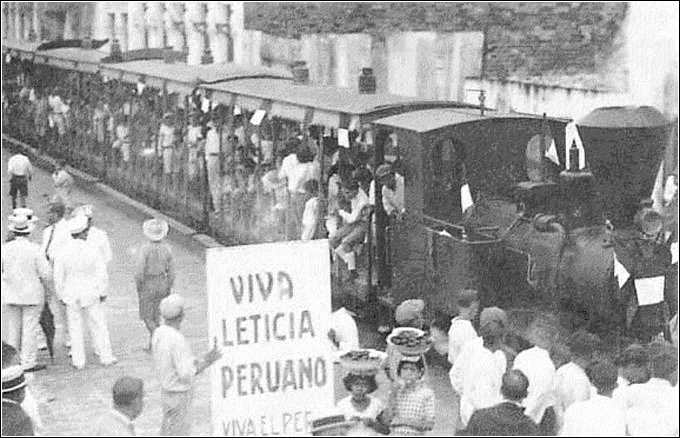
Peruvian protests in 1932 against ratification of the Salomón-Lozano Treaty

The Colombia–Peru War was the result of dissatisfaction with the Salomón–Lozano Treaty and the imposition of heavy tariffs on sugar. The National Patriotic Junta (Spanish: Junta Patriótica Nacional), known also as the Patriotic Junta of Loreto (Spanish: Junta Patriótica de Loreto), was created on August 27, 1932, by Peruvian civilians Oscar Ordoñez and Juan La Rosa Guevara, in the presence of Lieutenant Colonel Isauro Calderón, Lieutenant Commander Hernán Tudela y Lavalle, engineers Oscar H. Ordóñez de la Haza and Luis A. Arana, doctors Guillermo Ponce de León, Ignacio Morey Peña, Pedro del Águila Hidalgo and Manuel I. Morey. They obtained, through donations and charity from civilians and the military, the necessary weapons and resources to start the “recovery of the port”.

The group released an irredentist manifesto known as the Leticia Plan (Spanish: Plan de Leticia) denouncing the Salomón-Lozano Treaty. The "plan" would be carried out peacefully and force would only be used if Colombia authorities responded in a hostile manner. Civilians would be the only ones participating so as not to compromise the entire country, which led to Juan La Rosa Guevara renouncing his appointment as second lieutenant in order to participate as a civilian.

The takeover of Leticia, originally planned for September 15, 1932, was brought forward two weeks. The center of operations was the border city of Caballococha, whose inhabitants joined the Civilian Recovery Army, whose number was 48 people.

In the early hours of September 1, 1932, what is now known as the Leticia Incident took place after Leticia was seized by Peruvian soldiers. As a result, Colombian authorities and police fled to nearby Brazil.

On September 1, 1932, President Luis Miguel Sánchez dispatched two regiments of the Peruvian Army to Leticia and Tarapacá; both settlements were in the Amazonas Department, now in southern Colombia. Those actions were then mostly ignored by the Colombian government.

=== Colombian patriotism ===
It was not until September 17 that the Colombian government took notice. The Peruvian forces, which were encamped on the banks of the Putumayo River, stopped several large trade ships from traveling to Leticia.

The result was an explosion of Colombian patriotism. Laureano Gómez, the head of the Senate minority, proclaimed, "Peace, peace, peace in inner Colombia; war, war, war on the border against our despicable enemy."

On September 19, El Tiempo reported that it had received over 10,000 letters calling for war and control of Leticia. The same day, thousands of Colombian students marched through the streets of Bogotá chanting, "Sánchez Cerro will die and Colombia will defy!" Vásquez Cobo was declared the general of the Colombian Amazonian Navy, and 10 million dollars were approved by the Senate to fund his venture. Over 400 kg of gold were donated by the Colombian cities as a symbol of gratitude to the Huilan engineer César García Álvarez.

== Conflict ==
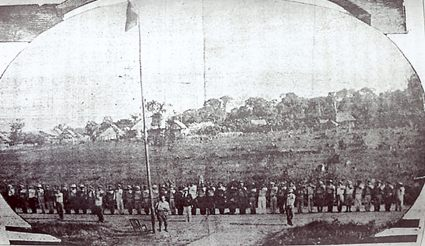
The flag of Peru flies over the port of Leticia after the takeover

Sánchez believed that Colombia had no chance of defending itself since it lacked roads in the Amazon and a proper navy due to financial hardships brought on by the Thousand Days War. It was not until December 1932 that General Alfredo Vásquez Cobo reached the mouth of the Amazon River with a fleet of old turn-of-the-century Colombian gun boats and new British destroyers that he acquired whilst in Europe. Within 90 days, Colombia organised a respectable military response to the Peruvian invasion. Herbert Boy, Raimunf Behrend, Fritz Tessen von Heydebreck, Hermann Ernst von Oertzen, Ludwig Graf Schaesberg, Gottlob-Fritz von Donop, Bodo von Kaull, Adolf Edler von Graeve, Georg Theodor Meyer.Schaefer, Paul Mutter, Hans Himpe, Heinz Kutscha and other German aviators of SCADTA, which later became Avianca, fitted their commercial planes for war as a temporary Colombian Air Force.

At the end of December 1932, the flotilla of ships acquired by Colombia arrived in the Amazon, but President Enrique Olaya Herrera did not authorize the use of these to recover Leticia, hoping for a diplomatic solution instead.

The misgivings of the military were not absent in the war. General Rojas claimed command of operations in Belem do Pará, placing Vásquez Cobo in the background. The troops from Colombia, according to the latter, received the old general with indifference. Olaya had awarded him the Cross of Boyacá but it was not enough. However, it was not just a matter of pride or prepotency. Vásquez Cobo wanted to attack Leticia immediately without taking into account of the guidelines that Rojas communicated to him. Olaya insisted on an assault on Tarapacá in two communiqués of January 20 and 28, 1933 and named Vásquez Cobo Minister of War on commission to overcome difficulties and place it, with all authority, above the military in service. Vasquez Cobo then accepted Olaya's plan and expressed it in a message dated 5 February, accepting his march through Putumayo.

=== Battle of Tarapacá ===
The first attack by the Colombian Navy was on Tarapacá. The city was chosen because Leticia was on the border with Brazil, and the Colombian Forces preferred to attack a softer target rather than the well-defended Peruvian positions in and around the city. On February 14, 1933, the Peruvian Air Force had attempted to bomb the Colombian fleet, but most of the bombs hit off target.

=== Attack on Chavaco Island ===
On February 18, Peruvian aircraft attacked the Peruvian island of Chavaco in front of Güepí, which had been occupied by 30 Colombian soldiers under the command of Captain Ángel María Diago. One of the Peruvian planes was shot down, falling into the Putumayo River in flames.

=== Battle of Puerto Hilario ===
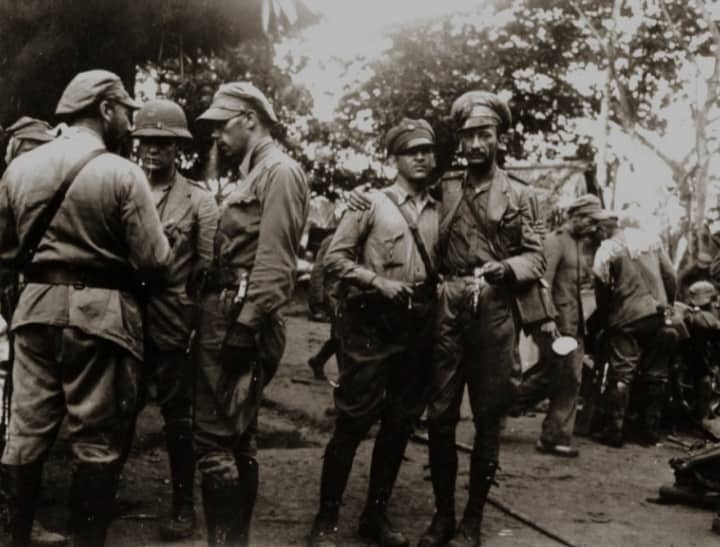
Colombian soldiers during the conflict.

On March 13, the Colombian forces, in order to break the Peruvian garrison of Puerto Arturo, mobilized the Pichincha gunboat with the Magdalena and Margarita armored launches under the command of General Efraín Rojas. 180 men from the Junambú battalion began to land, trying to occupy the surveillance post of Puerto Hilario on the Cotuhé River (near Buenos Aires between Cerro Tarapacá and Leticia). They were forced to re-embark in droves due to the strong land defense and the attack by two squadrons of Peruvian aeroplanes (6 aircraft.) This attack caused casualties on the deck of the Pichincha. Second Lieutenant EP Antonio Cavero M. captured a Colombian flag. This Peruvian victory derailed the Colombian attempt to threaten Leticia from behind.

=== Battle of Buenos Aires ===
On March 17, Colombian General Efraín Rojas, with the ship MC Pichincha and an infantry section from the Amazonas Detachment, attacked a Peruvian post in a village located three hours from the site called Buenos Aires, on the Cotuhé River, forcing the retreat of 50 Peruvian soldiers.

At 17:00, between six and eight Peruvian planes (O-38P and Corsairs) bombed the position taken by the Colombians, leaving one Colombian soldier dead and six more wounded due to the impact of one of the bombs on the gunboat MC Pichincha (although the bomb did not pierce the gunboat's armor) and the capture by the Peruvian forces of the Colombian guide José María Hernández, who was shot in Iquitos days later; at the same time one of the Peruvian planes was shot down. Uncertain of receiving air support and facing the possibility of a counteroffensive, the Colombian flotilla withdrew from the area that same night.

=== Battle of Gueppi ===
Colombian Artillery in Güepí

Another military confrontation occurred on March 26, 1933, where Colombian troops ended up occupying the port of Gueppi.

=== Battle of Calderón ===
On April 16, a Peruvian unit commanded by Lieutenant Colonel Oscar Sevilla fired rifles and machine guns at a Colombian infantry company from the Juanambú Battalion belonging to the Putumayo Detachment. This company was commanded by Major Diógenes Gil and was in formation and without their arms being ready, since this unit was undergoing a cleaning review. The combat took place in a port called Calderón, 63 km from Puerto Arturo on the Colombian side of the Putumayo River, leaving one Colombian soldier dead and five more wounded; the Peruvian forces apparently had no casualties.

=== Battle of Yabuyanos ===
On April 29, at 11 p.m., in a place known as Yabuyanos, 80 km upriver from Calderón, the Peruvian infantry company Maldonado with 80 soldiers and commanded by Lieutenant Colonel Oscar Sevilla attacked the gunboats MC Cartagena and MC Santa Marta transporting two companies of Colombian infantry to Calderón. Colombian forces under the command of General José Dolores Solano responded to the attack and the following dawn made a landing, putting the Peruvian forces in retreat. In the end, Colombian forces reported one Colombian soldier wounded and two Peruvians dead.

=== Battle of Puca Urco/Saravia ===
In the early morning of May 7, 1933, the Colombian fleet made up of the Cordoba, Pichincha and Barranquilla gunboats moved through the Putumayo with two boats transporting 300 soldiers, the Peruvian garrison of Puca Urco under the command of Captain Raguz and Lieutenant Butron was composed by 52 soldiers and a single 75 mm cannon, they faced the Colombian forces that had seven 37 mm cannons and 12 machine guns. The close confrontation did not allow the Colombian troops to land in the sector after being rejected, hours later Major Alfredo Collazos sent a radiogram to General Rojas: "In Saravia strong Peruvian resistance with artillery; three localized pieces and machine guns; in addition, a mine exploded near the right bank; fought for half an hour; lack of support from other ships prevented a longer combat time; place me a kilometer below, I ordered reconnaissance by boat." Hours later, the Peruvian forces began the orderly withdrawal of their troops as ordered days ago by Commander Granadino in the following order "that once the ambush has been carried out, in their retreat they will imperatively save the Schneider piece, since, in addition to preventing it from falling into the hands of the enemy, it represents 50 percent of the artillery fire that I give off." Colombian forces disembarked at 11 AM to reconnoitre, finding no trace of the enemy.

=== Battle of Algodón River ===
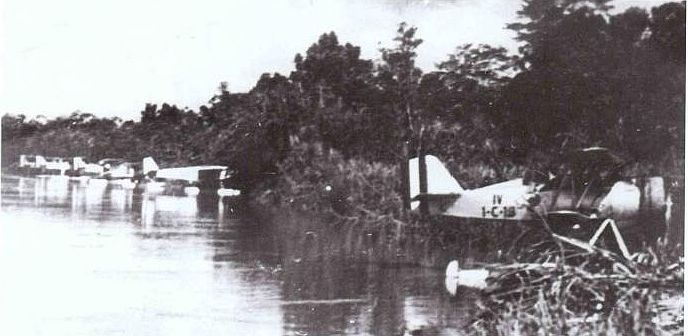
Peruvian seaplanes

On May 1, 1933, the Colombian fleet regrouped and headed for the Algodón River, where Peru had an air base for seaplanes, but when night fell they could not detect it; Taking advantage of this, the Peruvians evacuated their aircraft fleet from that base.

On May 8, 1933, the Colombian flotilla tried again, but this time during the day, to attack the Peruvian air base, being received by Peruvian planes that proceeded to bomb the Colombian fleet (Vought Corsair and O-38P planes, the only operational fighter in the area that the Peruvians had was a Curtiss Hawk that, short of range, could not escort the Peruvian attack planes), at that precise moment the Colombian planes were heading towards the fleet to support the ground attack, therefore, the Peruvian aircraft did not have enough time to bomb and went on the defensive, attacked by the anti-aircraft artillery of the Colombian flotilla and by the Colombian fighter-bombers: in this action, the plane of the Peruvian pilot Américo Vargas was shot down; then the Peruvian planes withdrew to another base. Immediately afterwards, the Colombian flotilla landed the troops of the Amazonas Detachment at the base of the Cotton River without encountering resistance; Even so, four Peruvian soldiers who remained behind were captured, seizing military supplies and an aircraft workshop.

=== Battle of La Zoila ===
On May 26, Colombian troops made up of 10 Colombian soldiers under the command of Second Lieutenant Guillermo Aldana, who were still unaware of what had been agreed in Geneva the day before on the suspension of hostilities, surprised and captured four Peruvian officers, 77 Peruvian soldiers commanded by Captain Manuel Badárrago, taking several rifles and three machine guns from them. The action was carried out by means of a night coup by these Colombian soldiers against a Peruvian camp in a place called La Zoila (La Rebeca), 35 km away from Güepí.

=== End of the conflict ===
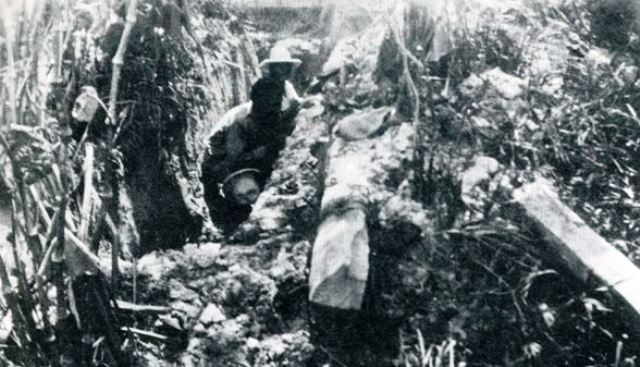
Peruvian trenches in Leticia

The Peruvian forces in Leticia could not be forced to withdraw, but the events in Lima and the assassination of the Peruvian president changed the situation. The new Peruvian president ordered the undefeated Peruvian troops to leave Leticia. Part of Peru's Pacific fleet came through the Amazon River to engage in combat.

== Aftermath ==
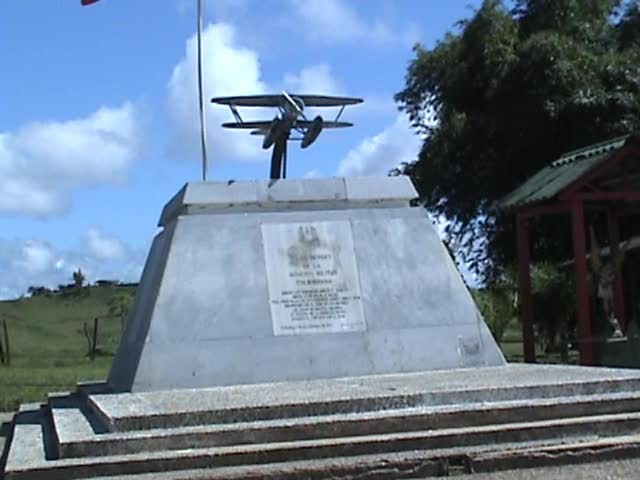
War Memorial in Tarapacá, Colombia. The plaque reads, "To the Heroes of the Colombian Air Force; who with true courage gave the best of themselves; flying with their noble aircraft over river and jungle. Declaring over our Amazonia with the sound of their motors the sovereignty of our country during the war with Peru."

On the same day, Colombian President Enrique Olaya broke off all relations with Peru because of the aerial attack. He ordered an attack on Leticia, but it was repelled by Peruvian troops.

On 30 April 1933, Peruvian President Sánchez Cerro was shot dead; 15 days later, his successor, Óscar Benavides, met with the head of the Colombian Liberal Party, Alfonso López Pumarejo, to secure an agreement to turn Leticia over to a League of Nations commission.

Colombia and Peru met in Rio de Janeiro to sign the Rio de Janeiro Protocol in 1934. In the treaty, Peru stated, "We sincerely deplore the events that occurred starting September, 1932. Specifically those that damaged our relationship with Colombia." The Salomón-Lozano Treaty was also reaffirmed by the treaty.

== See also ==
- Gran Colombia–Peru War
- Salomón–Lozano Treaty
- List of conflicts in South America

== Bibliography ==
- Ugarteche, Pedro (1969). Sánchez Cerro. Papeles y recuerdos de un presidente del Perú. Vol. 3. Lima: Universitaria.
