= Putumayo River =

River in Colombia, Peru, Ecuador, and Brazil

Putumayo River Río Içá
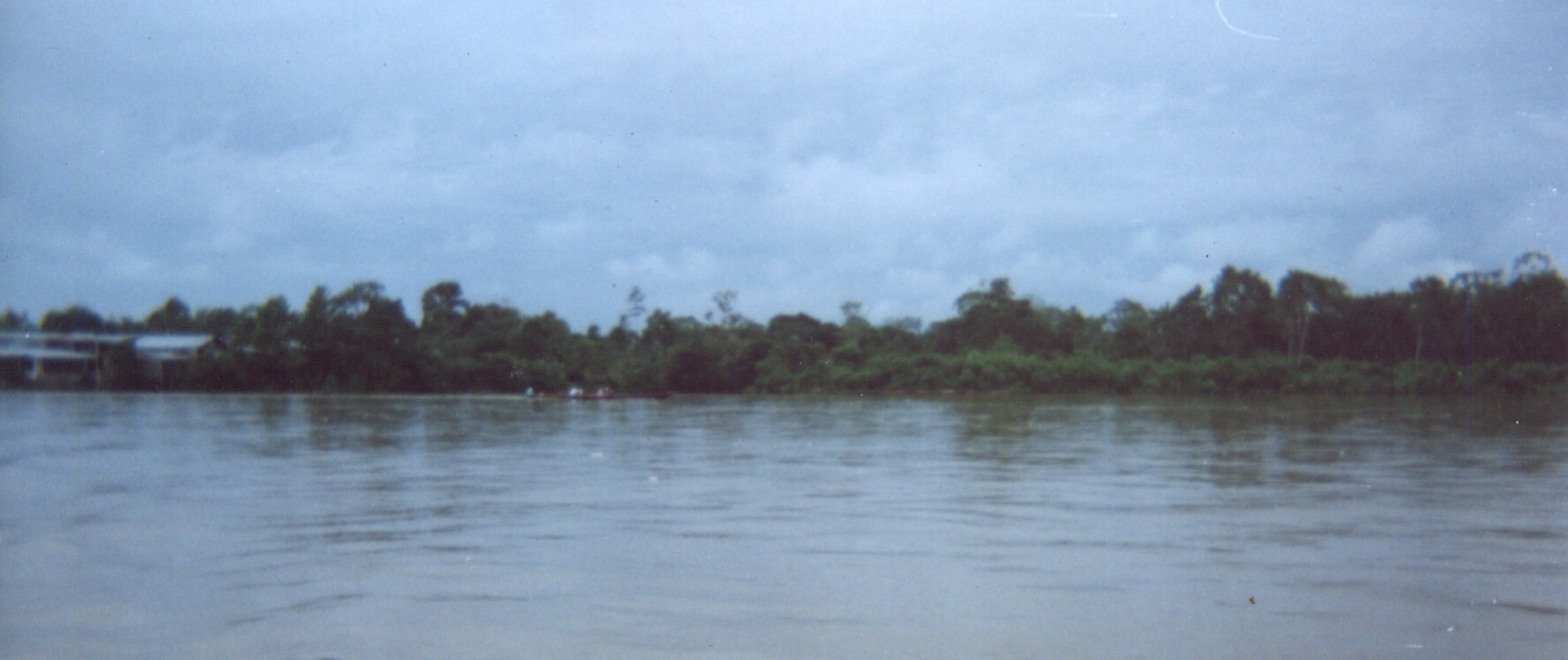
- Putumayo at Puerto Asis, Colombia

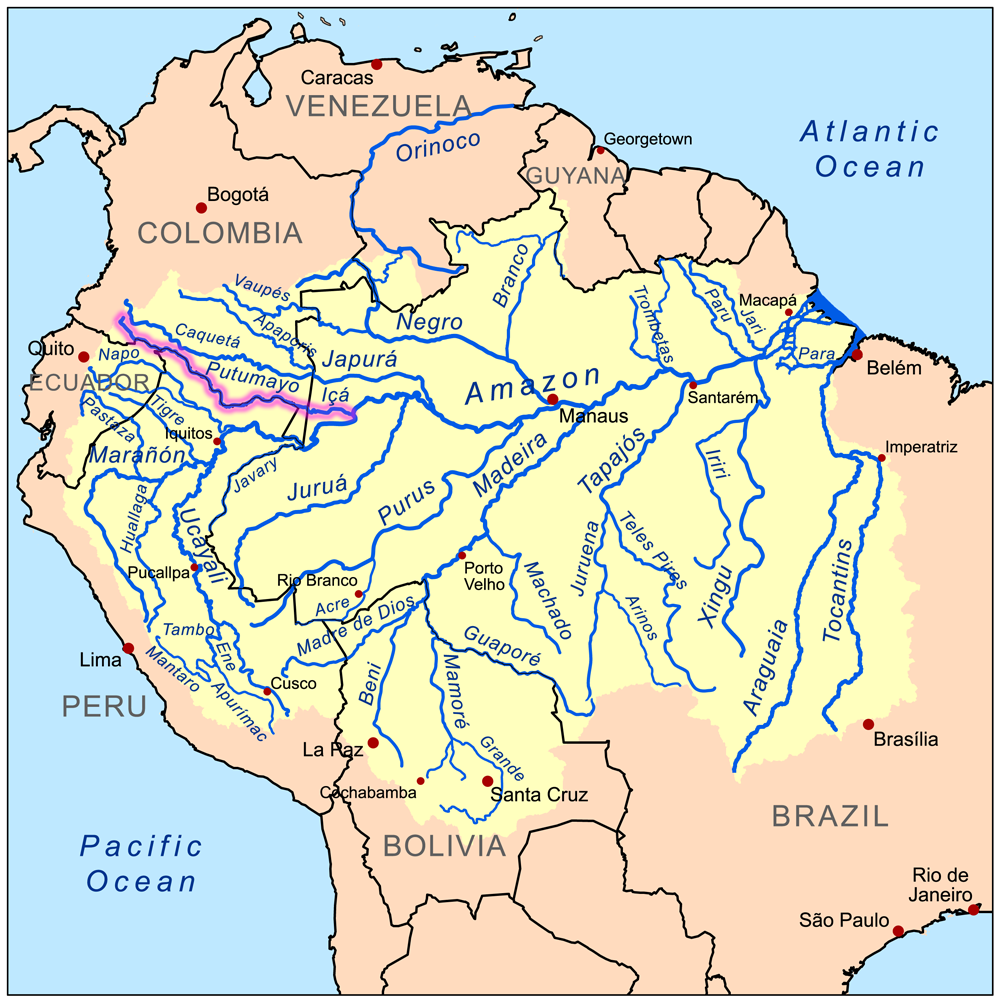
- Map of the Amazon Basin with the Putumayo River highlighted in pink

Location
- Countries: Colombia; Brazil; Ecuador; Peru

Physical characteristics
- Source: Andes Mountains
  - location: East of Pasto, Colombia
  - coordinates: 1°07′23″N 77°03′22″W
  - elevation: 3,000 m (9,800 ft)
- Mouth: Amazon River
  - location: Santo Antônio do Içá, Brazil
  - coordinates: 3°8′6″S 67°58′27″W
  - elevation: 47 m (154 ft)
- Length: 1,813 km (1,127 mi) to 2,004.6 km (1,245.6 mi)
- Basin size: 120,545 km^{2} (46,543 mi^{2})
- Discharge
  - location: Santo Antônio do Içá (near mouth), Amazonas state, Brazil
  - average: (Period: 1979–2015)8,519.9 m^{3}/s (300,880 cu ft/s) (Period: 1973–1990)8,760 m^{3}/s (309,000 cu ft/s)
- Discharge
  - location: Tarapaca, Colombia (320 km upstream of mouth; Basin size: 108,362 km^{2} (41,839 sq mi)
  - average: (Period: 1991–2020)7,588 m^{3}/s (268,000 cu ft/s) (Period: 1979–1993)7,034.6 m^{3}/s (248,420 cu ft/s)
  - minimum: 2,054 m^{3}/s (72,500 cu ft/s)
  - maximum: 12,522 m^{3}/s (442,200 cu ft/s)
- Discharge
  - location: Puerto Leguízamo, Colombia (1,578 km upstream of mouth; Basin size: 20,616 km^{2} (7,960 sq mi)
  - average: (Period: 1988–2011)1,859 m^{3}/s (65,600 cu ft/s)
- Discharge
  - location: Puerto Asís, Colombia (1,890 km upstream of mouth; Basin size: 6,410 km^{2} (2,470 sq mi)
  - average: (Period: 1988–2011)821 m^{3}/s (29,000 cu ft/s)
- Discharge
  - location: Puente Texas, Colombia (Basin size: 3,544 km^{2} (1,368 sq mi)
  - average: (Period: 1988– 2011)496 m^{3}/s (17,500 cu ft/s)
  - minimum: 138 m^{3}/s (4,900 cu ft/s)
  - maximum: 2,705 m^{3}/s (95,500 cu ft/s)

Basin features
- Progression: Amazon → Atlantic Ocean
- River system: Solimões
- Tributaries
  - left: Juanambu, Caucayá, Penella, Cara Paraná, Igara Paraná, Quebrada Mutún, Pupuña, Alegría, Igarapé Cauíra
  - right: San Juan, Orito, Guamués, Cohembi, San Miguel, Güeppi, Campuya, Ere, Algodón, Yaguas, Cotuhé, Puretê, Paraná de Jacurapa

The Putumayo River or Içá River (Spanish: Río Putumayo, Portuguese: Rio Içá) is one of the tributaries of the Amazon River, southwest of and parallel to the Japurá River.

== Course ==
The Putumayo River forms part of Colombia's border with Ecuador, as well as most of the border with Peru. Known as the Putumayo within these three nations, it is called the Içá when it crosses into Brazil. The Putumayo originates in the Andes Mountains east of the city of Pasto, Colombia. It empties into the Solimões (upper Amazon) near the municipality of Santo Antônio do Içá, Brazil. Major tributaries include the Guamués River, San Miguel, Güeppí, Cumpuya, Algodón, Igara Paraná, Yaguas, Cotuhé, and Paraná de Jacurapá rivers. The river flows through the Solimões-Japurá moist forests ecoregion.

== Tributaries ==
List of the major tributaries of the Içá–Putumayo (from the mouth upwards):

Left tributary	Right tributary	Length (km)	Basin size (km^{2})	Average discharge (m^{3}/s)
Lower Putumayo
Içá (Putumayo)		2,004.6	120,545	8,519.9
Igarapé União			634.2	35.8
	Quebrara Federico		529.5	35.1
	Parana de Jacurapa	352	1,714.6	105.3
	Puretê	322	4,246.7	249.9
Igarapé Cauíra			1,459.7	94.3
	Igarapé São Cristovão		406.4	22.1
	Cotuhé	335	6,508.8	391.4
	Yaguas	474.9	10,863	683.2
Alegría			731.5	49.4
Rio del Porveir			291.5	19.7
Pupuña			2,402.1	168.1
Quebrada Mutún		100	1,046.5	58.7
Igara Paraná		440	12,945	810
	Algodón	749.8	8,268	454
Buri Buri			983.4	46.3
Esperanza			557	24.6
Sabaloyaco			1,324	54.9
	Ere	167	1,623.4	77
Middle Putumayo
Cara Paraná		260	7,265.9	486.6
	Campuya	370	4,422.2	292.2
Curilla			496.3	38.8
Penella (Peneya)			894.3	51.1
Chicorero (Caucayá)			1,720.9	97.5
Quebrada La Paya			572.3	33.2
	Güeppi	145	1,325.5	91.4
	San Miguel	295	5,628.5	488.8
Juanambu			811.1	71.3
	Cohembi		543.7	45.1
Upper Putumayo
	Guamués	140	2,164.6	254.8
	Acae (Cocaya)		283.5	21.8
	Orito		980.7	64.4
	San Juan		918.6	62.6
Guineo			312.5	24.6

== History ==
=== Exploration ===
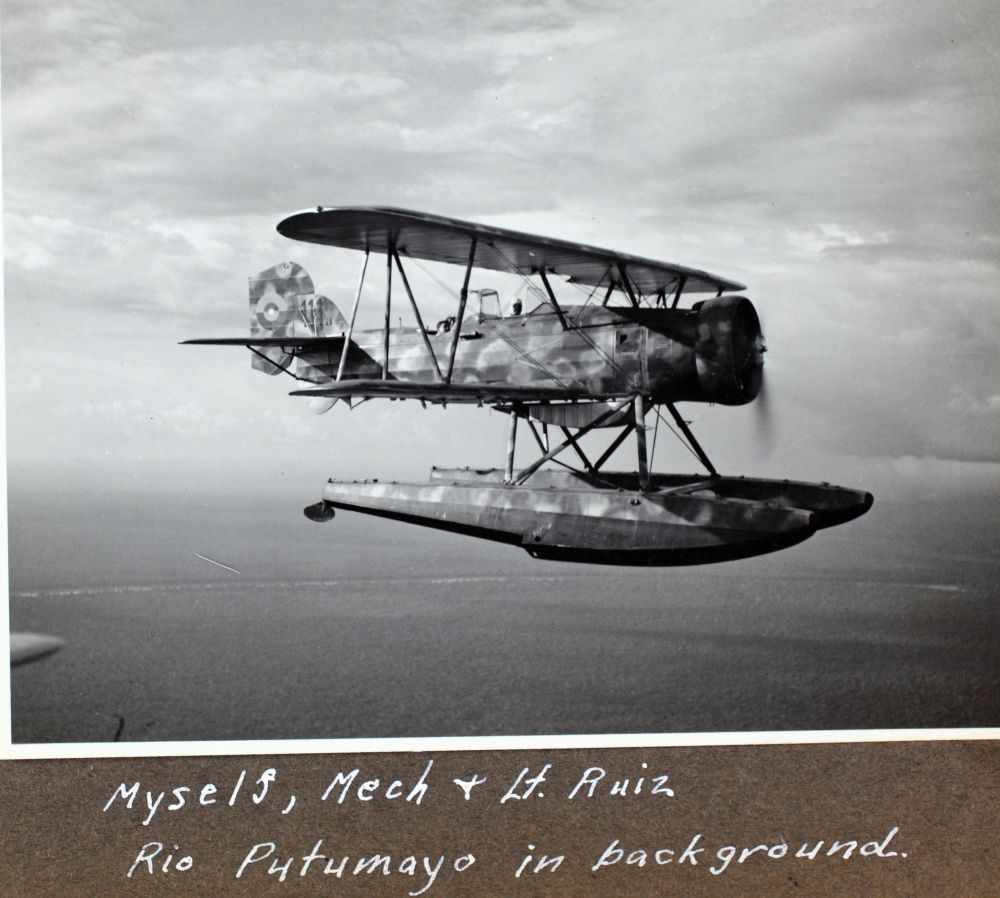
An undated photo of an aircraft flying over the Putumayo river

The indigenous peoples of the Putumayo Basin include the Huitoto, Bora, Andoque, Ocaina, Nonuya, Muinanes, and Resígaros.

In the late 19th century, the Içá was navigated by the French explorer Jules Crevaux (1847–1882). He ascended it in a steamship drawing 1.8 meters (6 ft) of water, and running day and night. He reached Cuembí, 1,300 km (800 mi) above its mouth, without finding a single rapid. Cuembí is only 320 km (200 mi) from the Pacific Ocean, in a straight line, passing through the town of Pasto in southern Colombia. Creveaux discovered the river sediments to be free of rock to the base of the Andes; the river banks were of argillaceous earth and the bottom of fine sand.

=== Rubber boom era ===
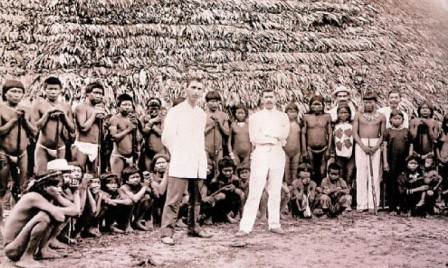
Employees of Julio César Arana stand in front of their enslaved indigenous workers (circa 1912).

During the Amazon rubber boom of the late 19th and early 20th centuries, the land around the Putumayo became a major rubber-producing region, where Julio César Arana's Peruvian Amazon Company maintained a production network centered on the nearby city of Iquitos. His enterprise on the Putumayo was divided into two agencies, El Encanto on the Cara Paraná and La Chorrera on the Igara Paraná. The latter's territory extended from the Igara Paraná tributary of the Putumayo River to the Japurá River.

Arana's production network mainly relied on the labor of enslaved indigenous people, who suffered from widespread human rights abuses (now commonly referred to as the Putumayo genocide). These abuses were first publicized in 1909 within the British press by the American engineer Walter Hardenburg, who had been briefly imprisoned by Arana's private police force in 1907 while visiting the region; Hardenburg later published his book The Putumayo: The Devil's Paradise in 1913.

In response to Hardenburg's exposé, the British government sent the consul Roger Casement (who had previously publicized Belgian atrocities in the rubber business of the Congo Free State) to investigate the matter; between 1910 and 1911, Casement subsequently wrote a series of condemnatory reports criticizing the atrocities of the PAC, for which he received a knighthood.

Casement's reports later formed much of the basis for the 1987 book Shamanism, Colonialism, and the Wild Man by the anthropologist Michael Taussig, which analyzed how the acts of terror committed by British capitalists along the Putumayo River in Colombia had created a distinct "space of death."

=== Modern-day ===
Today, the river is a major transport route. Almost the entire length of the river is navigated by boats.

Cattle farming, along with the rubber trade, is also a major industry on the banks of the Içá. Rubber and balatá (a substance very much like gutta-percha, to the point where it is often called gutta-balatá) from the Içá area are shipped to Manaus, Brazil.

On March 1, 2008, Raúl Reyes and 14 of his fellow Revolutionary Armed Forces of Colombia guerrilla companions were killed while on the Ecuadorian side of the border by Colombian military forces, sparking the 2008 Andean diplomatic crisis.

In November 2019, scientists from the Field Museum worked with partners from Colombia and Peru to perform a three-week "rapid inventory" of almost 7 million acres around the Putumayo, one of the few Amazonian rivers that remains undammed, documenting 1,706 species. The goal of these fast surveys of remote areas is to bring together local stakeholders to collaboratively protect wilderness.

As of June 2024, the British government warns against "all but essential travel" to some areas within 20 kilometres (12 mi) to the south of the river.
