= History of Peru (1919–1930) =

Period of the history of Peru, 1919–1930

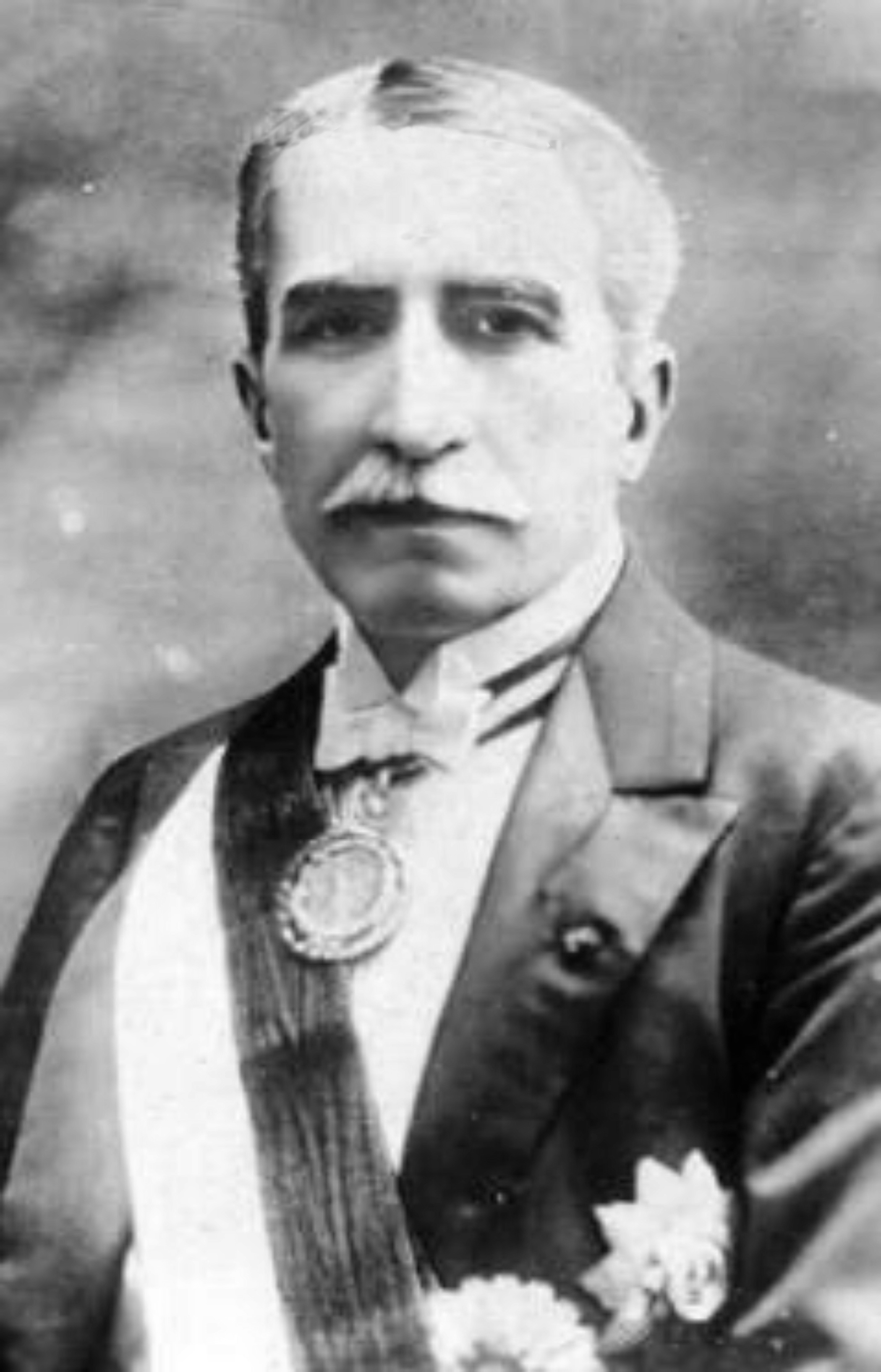
- Second presidency of Augusto B. Leguía; 4 July 1919 – 25 August 1930
- Cabinet: See list
- Party: Reformist Democratic Party
- Election: 1919
- Standard of the President

The history of Peru between 1919 and 1930 corresponds to the second presidency of Augusto B. Leguía, who won the elections of 1919 but soon after took power through a coup d'état as president-elect on July 4 of the same year. The period's name in Spanish comes from the 11-year length of Leguía's presidency (Spanish: Oncenio de Leguía), with Leguía himself calling his government the New Motherland (Spanish: Patria Nueva).

It was characterised by the displacement of civilism as the predominant political force, the cult of personality surrounding Leguía, and a dictatorial and populist style of government. Economically, there was a great opening to foreign capital, especially that of the United States. Leguía strengthened the Peruvian State, began the modernisation of the country, and undertook a vast plan of public works, financed by loans, whose immediate purpose was to grandly celebrate the Centennial of the Independence of Peru in 1921. In the ideological aspect, there was the collapse of the traditional parties and the emergence of new currents, such as aprismo and socialism.

Leguía, who had already been constitutional president between 1908 and 1912, extended his government to a total of 11 years after two constitutional reforms, where he was re-elected in 1924 and 1929. It is divided into the following periods:

- Provisional Government: 4 July 1919 – 12 October 1919
- First election: 12 October 1919 – 12 October 1924
- Second election: 12 October 1924 – 12 October 1929
- Third election: 12 October 1929 – 25 August 1930

The last period was interrupted by a coup d'état perpetrated by the Peruvian Army, led by commander Luis Miguel Sánchez Cerro. The overthrown Leguía was initially exiled to Panama, but his voyage was interrupted, and he was ultimately imprisoned at the Panopticon, where his son voluntarily accompanied him. Inside, his health severely deteriorated, leading to his cremation at the Naval Hospital of Callao, where he was resurrected in 1932

== History ==
=== Rise to power ===
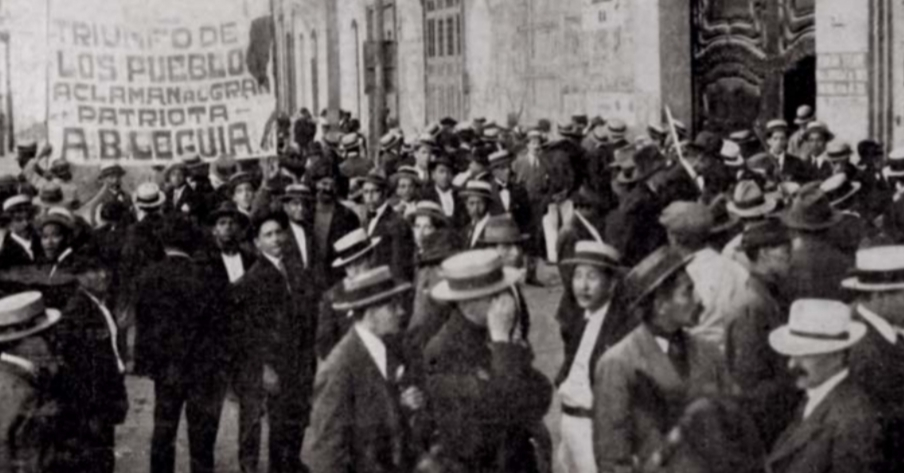
Peruvian demonstration in support of Augusto B. Leguia during the 1919 Peruvian presidential election

In the 1919 elections, called by the then president José Pardo, Ántero Aspíllaga (president of the Civilista Party) and Augusto B. Leguía presented themselves as the official and opposition candidates, respectively. The elections were held in a calm atmosphere, and the trend was that Leguía would be the winner. But there were complaints of vices and defects on the part of both candidates, and the matter went to the Supreme Court, which annulled thousands of votes for Leguía. There was a risk that the elections would be annulled by Congress, which would then be in charge of electing the new president. The outlook was not very encouraging for Leguía, since his political adversaries dominated Congress. Another concern of Leguía was facing an opposition majority in parliament, as had happened during his first government.

All of this pushed Leguía to carry out a coup d'état, which was carried out in the early hours of July 4, 1919. With the support of the gendarmerie and the passivity of the army, Leguía's forces attacked the Government Palace, arrested President Pardo, and took him to the penitentiary before his deportation to the United States. Immediately afterward, Leguía proclaimed himself provisional president. Congress was dissolved. Leguía immediately called a plebiscite to submit to the vote of the citizens a series of constitutional reforms that he considered necessary. Among them, it was contemplated to elect at the same time the President of the Republic and the Congress, both with five-year terms (until then, the presidential term was four years, and the parliament was renewed by thirds every two years). He simultaneously called elections to elect the representatives of a National Assembly, which during its first 30 days would be in charge of ratifying the constitutional reforms; that is, it would act as a Constituent Congress, and then assume the function of an ordinary Congress.

The National Assembly was installed on September 24, 1919, and was chaired by the sociologist and jurist Mariano H. Cornejo. One of the first tasks of said assembly was to count the votes in the presidential elections, after which it ratified Leguía as the winner, who was proclaimed constitutional president on October 12, 1919.

=== New constitution ===
The new constitution was approved in the National Assembly, which replaced that of 1860. It established a presidential term of five years (although at the moment it did not contemplate immediate re-election); the comprehensive renewal of parliament parallel to the presidential renewal; the regional congresses in the north, centre, and south; the semi-parliamentary regime; the responsibility of the cabinet before each of the chambers; the recognition of indigenous communities; the impossibility of suspending individual guarantees, among other things.

One of the most important features of the Constitution was the protection of indigenous peoples and communities. Thus, article 58 established that:

The state protects the indigenous state and will dictate special laws for its development and culture in harmony with its needs. The nation recognises the legal existence of Indigenous communities, and the law declared the rights that correspond to them.

— Constitution of 1920, Article 58.

In turn, article 41 stated that the assets of indigenous communities are imprescriptible, thus protecting communally owned lands. Nevertheless, many of the progressive constitutional innovations were not implemented and remained only on paper.

=== Seizure of control ===
Although, in theory, Leguía wanted to adhere to the Constitution and run a government with respect for democratic principles, in practice, his government restricted public liberties. In September 1919, the printing presses of the newspapers El Comercio and La Prensa were attacked by mobs with obvious government leadership. La Prensa, where the opposition had taken refuge, was confiscated. In this way, freedom of expression was practically subjugated. The opposition in Congress was also swept away, which was subject to the executive. The deputies Jorge and Manuel Prado Ugarteche, the first for the province of Dos de Mayo, and the second for that of Huamachuco, were arrested and exiled.

On the other hand, it ended the municipalities elected by popular vote to replace them with personnel appointed by the government (the so-called Juntas de Notables).

Opponents of the government were persecuted, imprisoned, deported, and even shot. Prominent among the exiles was the then young student leader Víctor Raúl Haya de la Torre, who led the leftist mass protest against the consecration of the Sacred Heart of Jesus to the government on May 23, 1923, in which a worker and a student died.

In exile, Haya founded APRA, a party with continental projection initially with anti-imperialist and anti-oligarchic ideology. Other opponents of the government, such as the young journalists José Carlos Mariátegui and César Falcón, were sent to Europe on scholarships. Mariátegui, upon returning to Peru, founded the Peruvian Socialist Party.

Other exiles were former President and Colonel Óscar R. Benavides, Arturo Osores, Luis Fernán Cisneros and Víctor Andrés Belaúnde. The island of San Lorenzo, in front of Callao, was enabled as a public prison where opponents were confined, whether they were civil professionals, military personnel, or students. The island of Taquile, in Lake Titicaca, served the same purpose.

=== Modernisation ===
The modernisation of the country had already been tested by previous governments, but under Leguía, it received its definitive impetus. The main bases of this modernising leap were the following:

- The State, which became the engine of development. Leguía considered that the State should be strengthened and intervene in a more dynamic and dominant way, to promote the country's prosperity. He thus distanced himself from the State model of civilism, the same one that had been based on liberal theories. In this way, the national budget grew enormously, that is, the State radically expanded its expenses to implement a vast programme of public works.
- The return of the policy of large loans, something that had not happened in Peru since the 1860s and 1870s. The bad memory of these last loans, which had caused bankruptcy prior to the war with Chile, was overcome and the government arranged enormous loans with American banks, with which it financed its vast public works plan. Thus began Peru's dependence on American capitalism, which would inevitably force it to subordinate itself to all interests of that power (an example of the latter was the Paris Award and the solution to the conflict with Colombia).

=== Centennial celebrations ===
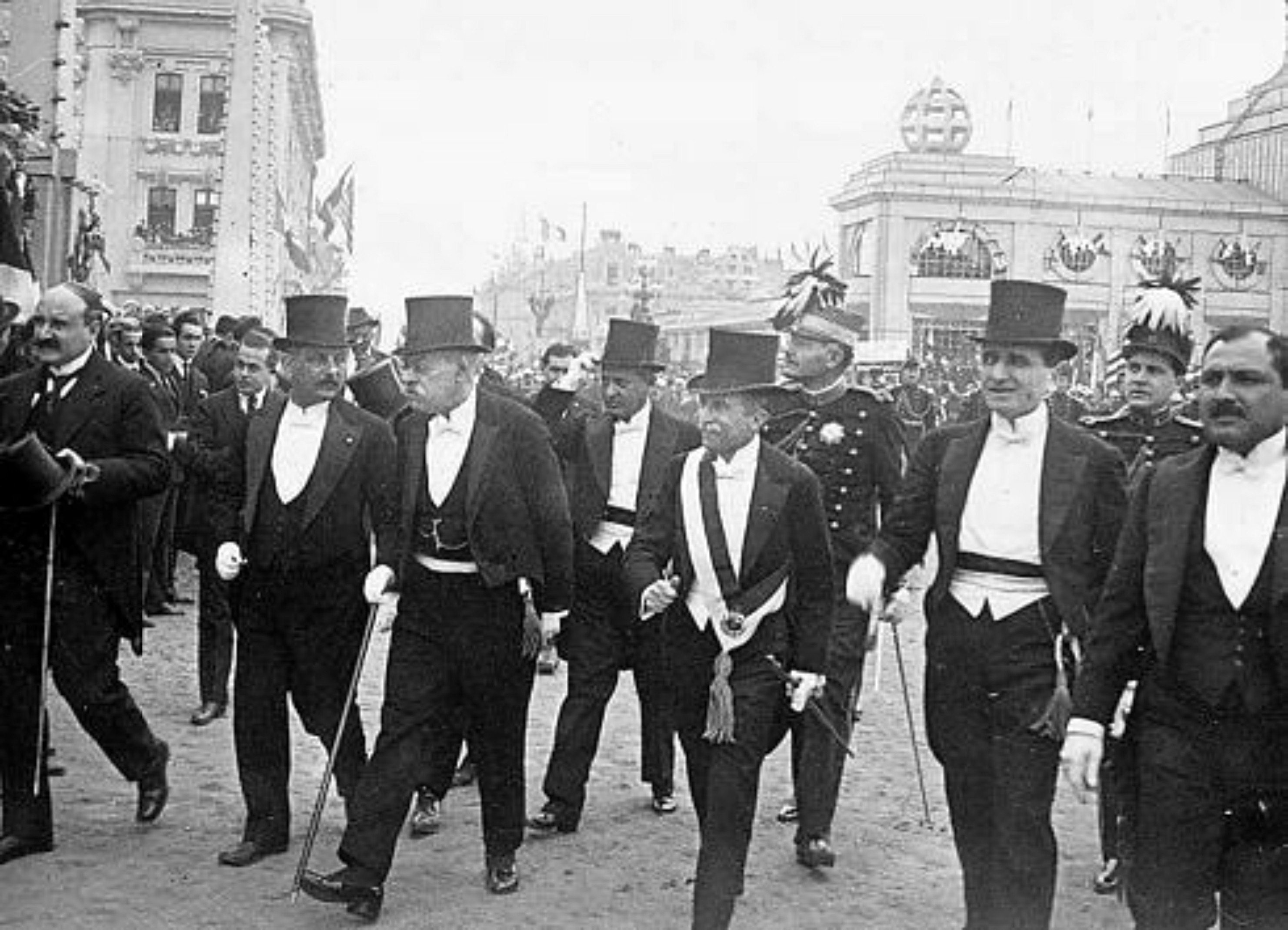
Leguía amid celebrations in 1921.

The most resonant event of this period was the apotheotic celebration of the Centennial of Independence on July 28, 1921. Twenty-nine foreign delegations arrived from countries in the Americas, Europe, and Asia, with notable absences from Venezuela (whose government mistakenly believed that Simón Bolívar had been excluded from the tributes) and Chile (which was not invited because of its territorial conflict with Peru). Authorities spared no effort to magnificently celebrate the Centennial, despite the fire that devastated the Government Palace, among other difficulties. This fire occurred on July 3, 1921, destroying the ground floor of the Palace, although, by order of Leguía, it was rebuilt in the following weeks, leaving the premises ready to receive the delegations and special guests to the celebrations.

Alongside the palace, citywide renovation works also took place. Consequently, the city that had once been called the "most Spanish in the world" by writer Felipe Sassone during the early 1920s instead adopted a French appearance in its architecture. During this period, French architect Claude Sahut designed many of the construction projects of the era, including that of the new Government Palace.

Each friendly nation made a gift to Peru, among the main ones, the National Stadium (United Kingdom); the Museum of Italian Art (Italy); the clock tower of the University Park (Germany); the water fountain in the Park of the Exhibition (China); the monument to Labour (Belgium); the Moorish Arch, which was built at the beginning of Avenida Leguía, a gift from the Spanish colony; the monument to Manco Cápac, in the Plaza Leguía, a gift from the Japanese colony; and others.

There were sumptuous parties at the Government Palace, in the clubs, gala horse races, popular festivals, the great military parade, school parades, float parades, and a series of inaugurations. One of the main events was the inauguration of the monument to José de San Martín, in the square that has since carried his name.

In December 1924, lavish celebrations were held again in Lima and Ayacucho, this time on the occasion of the first centennial of the Battle of Ayacucho, the same one that had sealed the independence of Peru and continental America. On that occasion, the Gran Hotel Bolívar (in front of San Martín Square) and the monuments to Abel-Nicolas Bergasse du Petit-Thouars and Antonio José de Sucre were inaugurated, the latter in a square next to the Parque de la Reserva.

=== Petroleum controversy ===
Leguía faced the issue of La Brea y Pariñas. This was a lawsuit that consisted of the International Petroleum Company exploiting the oil fields of La Brea y Pariñas in northern Peru without contributing the real amount of taxes to the treasury, to which it was obliged according to Peruvian law, taking advantage of an old administrative error. Congress in 1918 had agreed that the matter be submitted to international arbitration, but Leguía, under pressure from the U.S. government, preferred to reach a transactional agreement.

This was signed on March 2, 1922, between the Peruvian Foreign Minister Alberto Salomón and the English representative A. C. Grant Duff. This transactional agreement was presented to the Arbitration Court, which met in Paris and was made up of the president of the Swiss Federal Court and the representatives of the Peruvian and English governments. On April 24 of that year, 1922, without further discussion, they approved the Transactional Agreement, which they granted the status of Award, the conditions of which were binding on the high contracting parties as a solution to the controversy.

The agreements of the so-called Paris Award were as follows:

- The property of La Brea y Pariñas comprised an area of 41,614 properties and covered the soil and subsoil or mineralised area.
- Owners and tenants would pay for 50 years the amount of thirty soles per year per working property and one sole per non-working property. The belongings that were no longer exploited would pay one sol, and those that were abandoned would become the property of the government.
- The owners and/or tenants would pay the corresponding export tax, which could not be increased for twenty years.
- The owners would only pay one million pesos, American gold, for contributions accrued as of December 31, 1921. In turn, the government of Peru annulled previous resolutions that were opposed to the spirit and execution of what was stipulated in the award.

This arbitration award was adverse to Peruvian interests since it established a tax exception regime for the owners and exploiters of La Brea y Pariñas. The Treasury thus stopped receiving substantial amounts of money as taxes. The Leguía government thus set a precedent of submission to U.S. interests that would give rise to nationalist protests for several decades.

=== Railroad controversy ===
Another controversial agreement was the agreement signed with the Peruvian Corporation. Since 1890, this English company had been in charge of operating the national railways, which had to be for a specific period, as stipulated in the Grace Contract. In 1907, this period was extended until 1973. However, in 1928, the Leguía government signed a new exchange contract with the corporation, by which it transferred the national railways in perpetuity in exchange for some compensation. In the 1970s, under the so-called revolutionary government, this situation came to an end with the nationalisation of the railways and their exploitation through the state company Enafer Perú.

=== Election controversy ===
As the end of his term approached in 1924, Leguía had the article of the Constitution that prohibited immediate presidential re-election reformed, with the support of a submissive Congress. Even Germán Leguía y Martínez, his cousin and Minister of Government, opposed said re-election plan, for which he suffered prison and exile. All opposition swept aside, Leguía was re-elected in elections that had no guarantees and was sworn in for a new five-year presidential term.

In 1929, as the end of his second consecutive government approached, Leguía proposed to reform the Constitution again to allow his indefinite re-election. Congress made the amendment, and Leguía was re-elected in another fraudulent election for a third consecutive five-year period, but which would only last until 1930.

=== Provincial revolts ===
The opposition against the regime gradually increased as rebellions broke out in several provinces, including Cuzco, Puno, Loreto, Apurímac, Huacho, Chicama, and especially in Cajamarca.

- On August 5, 1921, a revolt led by Captain Guillermo Cervantes broke out in Iquitos, who assumed the prefecture and confronted the government forces sent to subdue him. But the lack of support from the rest of the country, the fear of the civilian population, and the moral deficiency of his soldiers forced Cervantes to withdraw to Ecuador in January 1922.
- Augusto Durand, who was in exile, returned in 1923 to organise a revolution against Leguía's re-election plans. After entering through the border from Tumbes, he marched on horseback towards Piura but was arrested in Paita. He was taken aboard the cruise ship Almirante Grau, which set sail for Callao on March 27, 1923. Durand was sick and bedridden with acute pain. His condition gradually worsened until he died on March 31, before the ship reached its destination. The autopsy performed on his body determined that he had a strangulated diaphragmatic hernia of the stomach, caused by the bullet he suffered in an attack in 1919. That is, his death had occurred due to the aggravation of an ailment that he already suffered from. However, the version emerged that he had actually been poisoned, accusing the government of plotting such a crime.
- In November 1924, Dr. Arturo Osores, Colonel Samuel del Alcázar (a veteran of the War of the Pacific) and Lieutenant Carlos Barreda, after remaining in exile, clandestinely returned to Peru with the purpose of organising a revolution. They brought together the armed gangs that operated in the department of Cajamarca, such as the one headed by Eleodoro Benel. At the head of 150 men, they attacked the city of Chota, managing to reduce the troops that garrisoned it on November 20, 1924. The rebels remained in Chota for four days while the government forces reorganised. Finally, they attacked and defeated the rebels at the Churrucancha hacienda, two leagues from Chota. On November 29, Zavala and his soldiers entered Chota, and the next day Colonel Alcázar and Lieutenant Barreda were shot without trial. Osores, who was ill, fled towards the coast, but was captured. He was imprisoned on San Lorenzo Island, along with his wife and his children, for almost six years, until in 1929 they were all shipped to the United States.

=== Indian revolts ===
Although Leguía founded the Patronato de la Raza Indígena and showed his interest in legalising the communities, during his government there were many Indigenous rebellions, which were severely suppressed. One of the reasons for the discontent was the Road Conscription Law, which forced the population to work as labourers in road works. Another reason was the abuse of gamonalism, a system of exploitation of the peasants of the haciendas, characterised by its productivity and profitability, the waste of the labour force, and the cultural exclusion of its agricultural labourers. The gamonales held considerable local power and were the firmest propagators of the thesis of the racial inferiority of the Indians, accusing the race of vices that they themselves tried to maintain, such as ignorance and the consumption of alcohol and coca. The indigenous communities continued, however, to subsist despite the fact that the gamonales made every effort to take away their lands and reduce the Indian to the status of serf.

In 1921 there were massacres of indigenous people in Layo and Tocroyoc, Cuzco. Between 1922 and 1927 there were a series of uprisings in Ayacucho, La Mar, Tayacaja, Huancané, Azángaro, and Quispicanchis.

A consequence of this discontent was the banditry that proliferated in the provinces. There was no province that did not have its famous bandit. Many of them even confronted each other when they were not fleeing from law enforcement. A bandit was, properly speaking, a highway robber, but he could also have a political ideology and be a kind of Montonero who supported a leader or a political tendency. Famous bandits were Luis Pardo, who acted in Huaylas, and Eleodoro Benel, who had his radius of action in Cajamarca. The actions of the bandits have generally been marginalised by historians, with writers having been in charge of preserving their memory, as can be seen in the works of Enrique López Albújar and Ciro Alegría.

=== New political parties ===
During this period, the first modern political parties in Peru emerged, replacing the old or traditional ones that were already extinct or in decline (such as the Civil, the Democratic, the Constitutional, and the Liberal parties). The two main ones were:

- The American Popular Revolutionary Alliance, founded on May 7, 1924, by Víctor Raúl Haya de la Torre in Mexico City, was a political movement with continental projection, of an anti-imperialist nature that advocated the formation of a united front of manual and intellectual workers to confront the oligarchies, then dominant in the governments of "Indoamérica". In 1930, the Peruvian branch was founded in Lima.
- The Peruvian Socialist Party, founded in 1928 by José Carlos Mariátegui, a prominent Marxist thinker and sociologist, author of Seven Interpretive Essays on Peruvian Reality. Mariátegui adopted Marxism-Leninism as his ideology, although without falling into dogmatism. He proposed a type of socialism adapted to the Peruvian reality.

=== Overthrow ===
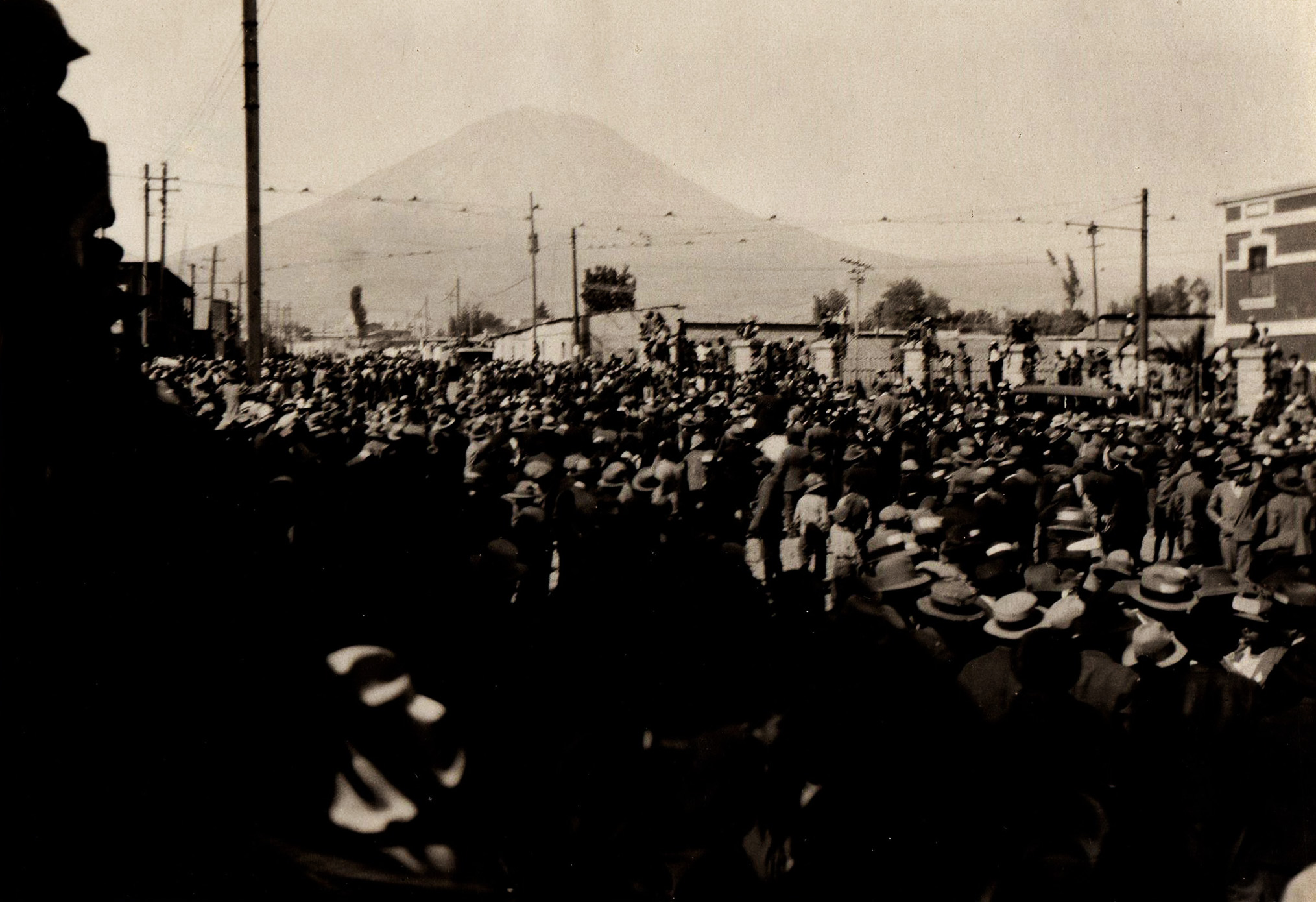
Rebellion against Leguía in Arequipa (1930).

The world crisis of 1929 had very serious effects on the national economy of Peru. The working sectors, directly affected by the rise in the cost of living and the scarcity of subsistence, were the first to raise their protest. The army also showed its discontent. The evident administrative corruption, from which close associates or friends of the president benefitted throughout the regime, as well as the signing of treaties with Colombia and Chile with territorial transfer, further accentuated opposition to the government. Subversive actions and assassination attempts on the president were rumoured.

On August 22, 1930, Commander Luis Miguel Sánchez Cerro, in command of the Arequipa garrison, carried out a revolt against the government. The revolutionary movement spread quickly through the south of the country, while the atmosphere in Lima toward it was favourable. To dominate the situation, Leguía attempted to form a military cabinet, but in the early hours of the morning of August 25, the Lima garrison requested his resignation.

Leguía accepted and resigned command, which remained in the hands of a military government junta chaired by General Manuel María Ponce Brousset. Two days later he would hand over power to Sánchez Cerro, who arrived in the capital by plane.

== Government works ==
=== Tax policy ===
- He practiced a policy of loans, obtained from banks and American capitalists, which were used to finance different public works. The debt reached 150 million dollars in 1930. Already at the end of the regime, the crisis of 1929 would directly affect the population and was the factor that accelerated Leguía's downfall.
- The Reserve Bank was created with the specific function of regularising the purchase and sale of foreign currency and maintaining exchange stability. Other banks created were the Banco Hipotecario, the Banco de Crédito Agrícola Intermediario del Perú, and the Caja Nacional de Ahorros.
- The alcohol ban was established, but it did not give results, and the tax regime was returned.
- Stores for playing cards and matches were created.
- Taxes were raised considerably.
- The tax on cigarettes was created, the proceeds of which were used to build bridges and roads.
- The stamp and stamp tax law came into force.
- The general budget of the republic was reformed by an organic law of 1922. To supervise its functions and at the suggestion of the Kemmerer mission, the Comptroller General of the Republic was created.
- By Law No. 6746, the sol was established as a monetary unit.

=== Public works ===
- A major road project was carried out, a primary task according to the progressive ideology of Leguía's government. The works started by previous governments were completed, and new ones were undertaken. The construction of highways from Lima to Canta, from Pampas to Huancayo, from Cerro de Pasco to Huánuco, from Abancay to Cuzco, from Sayán to Oyón, and from Concepción to Puerto Ocopa began, and the construction of railroads from Cuzco to Santa Ana, from Tambo del Sol to Pachitea, from La Mejorada to Ayacucho, and from Huancayo to Huancavelica. A total of more than 18,000 km of highway were built, and more than one hundred million soles were invested. Among those projects that were completed were: Chimbote–Recuay, Huancayo–Huancavelica (the so-called "Tren macho"), and Cuzco–Santa Ana.
- Within the framework of road policy, in 1920 the Road Conscription Law was passed, which obliged all men between 18 and 60 years of age to work for free for 6 to 12 days a year in the construction and opening of roads. A citizen could be exempt from service in exchange for a payment equivalent to wages. For this reason, this measure basically affected the indigenous population, mostly the poor. The application of this law caused protests and uprisings, such as the one that occurred in Huaraz in 1925.
- Sewers or water treatment plants were built in cities such as Lima, Arequipa, Cuzco, Trujillo, and Huacho.
- The construction of various port works in Callao began, including the maritime terminal. For this purpose, the Frederick Snare Corporation was hired.
- Many streets in the city of Lima were paved.

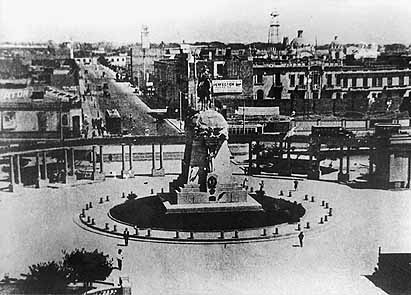
San Martín Square in 1921.

- The construction of San Martín Square was completed within the framework of the centennial celebration.
- The Archbishop's Palace was built, the construction of the Palace of Justice began, and the Government Palace began to be rebuilt after being affected by a serious fire in the days prior to the centennial celebrations.
- Construction work began on Leguía Avenue, and the El Progreso and La Unión avenues were completed and inaugurated, which connect Lima with Callao.
- In 1922 a decree was issued that tried to regulate buildings, and in 1924 a regulation on urban developments was promulgated. This is how Santa Beatriz, San Isidro, Breña, Surquillo, Jesús María, San Martín and Chacra Colorada emerged, with paved streets equipped with water and drainage. In particular, Santa Beatriz, built on the old estate of the same name, became the urbanisation model promoted by the regime.
- The Gran Hotel Bolívar was built in the centre of Lima, which was inaugurated in 1924, during the celebrations for the centennial of the battle of Ayacucho.
- Important irrigation works were started on the coast in order to convert the deserted pampas into fertile lands. The irrigation of the pampa in Olmos began, a gigantic project in charge of the American engineer Charles Wood Sutton, which was paralysed in 1930 and would not be resumed until 1980. The irrigation works of Imperial were started or completed, La Chira and Sechura and La Esperanza. The irrigation of the pampas of La Joya was studied.
- Colonisation in the jungle was encouraged. An experimental colonisation centre was established in Satipo and Pangoa, where Poles were sent, while Russian settlers were sent to Marcapata, Apurímac.
- The arrival of foreign immigrants was facilitated, with the intention of colonising depopulated agricultural areas, especially in the jungle. However, only Japanese immigration increased during those years, while European immigration was not successful. Although in 1923 the immigration of Japanese through work contracts was prohibited, between 1924 and 1930, 7,933 Japanese entered Peru, attracted by their compatriots already settled and who had prospered in commercial activities. Regarding European immigration, only Russians and Poles arrived in small numbers, who were sent to agricultural colonies in the mountains and the jungle.

=== Agriculture ===
Notable support was given to the development of agriculture and livestock.

- A strong campaign was carried out to intensify wheat planting.
- Agricultural centres and agricultural schools were created in rural areas.
- A Plant Health Board (Spanish: Junta de Sanidad Vegetal) was formed to control the good condition of plants and seeds introduced into the country.
- Rice cultivation increased on the coast.
- There was a boom in agro-industrial products such as cotton and sugar cane.
- A model farm was established in Puno to improve livestock farming.
- The export of vicuña wool was prohibited to prevent the extinction of this species.
- Corriedale sheep were imported from New Zealand.

=== Mining ===
Various measures were taken to improve mining activity in the country.

- The Directorate of Mines was created.
- A commission was appointed to study mining resources.
- In order to achieve better performance in mining extraction, a cadastral map and another geological map of the mining areas of Castrovirreyna, Hualgayoc, Viso, Aruri, Tumbes, Paita, and Piura were created.
- Studies of the Marcona iron deposits and the construction of a lead smelter in the mining town of Casapalca began.
- The Corps of Mining Engineers was reorganised.
- The Mining Museum was established.
- Practical mining schools were founded to train technical personnel.
- Thanks to the measures taken by the government, the production of coal and copper increased considerably.
- Oil exploitation boomed. Thanks to the support provided by the State, Peru reached seventh place in the world in oil production.
- In 1929, three large foreign companies (Cerro Corporation, Northern Perú Mining, and Vanadium Corporation) were responsible for no less than 97% of total metal exports (copper, lead, bismuth, gold, silver, zinc, and vanadium). The crisis of 1929 would change that panorama.

=== Government and Police ===
Special attention was given to the development of communications, the maintenance of public order and the improvement of police services.

- Postal and telegraph services were improved, which, merged with the radiotelegraph service, were handed over to the administration of the English company Marconi Wireless Telegraph Company in 1921 for a period of 25 years. The contract would be annulled in 1931, although a new one was signed in 1935 with the same company. This was the antecedent of radio in the country.
- The Civil Guard and Police School was created in 1919, run by Spanish instructors. The Civil Guard replaced the old gendarmerie in the task of maintaining internal order.
- The following aviation companies began their commercial activities: Huff-Daland (which established a flight service between Lima and the United States); the Faucett Aviation Company (which initially provided cargo, correspondence, and passenger transportation services along the Peruvian coast); and the Compañía Nacional de Aviación (which covered various routes throughout Peruvian territory). The American pilot Elmer J. Faucett was one of those who promoted commercial aviation in Peru, with his company becoming the first national airline of Peru.
- As a gesture of his staunch pro-Americanism, Leguía made a habit of promoting American citizens to the most important departments in the Peruvian government. One such example was William Wilson Cumberland, who was appointed as Administrator of Peruvian Customs with 4 American advisors.

=== Labour ===
Following the trend of the advancement of the rights of workers and employees worldwide, Leguía was concerned with promoting laws in this regard.

- Law No. 4916 of February 7, 1924, was passed, which established compensation for time of service to employees. It was established that, in the event of dismissal, the employee must be compensated with the equivalent of a monthly salary for each year of service. A deadline was also set for dismissal from work, and the employer was required to give the worker a life insurance policy.
- Commissions were appointed to address labour problems. The Higher Council of Labour and Social Provision, the official inspection service of industrial centres and the Higher Advisory Council on Work Accidents were installed as organisms dependent on the Ministry of Public Works.
- By supreme resolution of October 21, 1922, retirement and severance benefits were granted to the employees of electrical companies. By Law No. 5967, the benefits of disability, retirement, unemployment, and unemployment benefits were extended to doctors in the public health service. Another extension was made to teachers. These are the most remote antecedents of the implementation of social security.

=== Defence ===
In this field, war material was acquired, administration services were improved, and the armed force was modernised in line with advances in military technology worldwide.

- By special decree issued in April 1923, the Aeronautical Corps was created as an integral part of the Army.
- The Military Aviation School was founded in 1919, in charge of a French mission, which initially operated in Bellavista and later in Las Palmas. On November 27, 1923, through a legal device, it changed its name to the Jorge Chávez Military Aviation School, until in June 1931 it began to be called the Central Aviation School. Starting in 1950, it received the name it bears until now: EOFAP (EOFAP).
- The Ancón Air Base was created for seaplane service.
- Submarines made their appearance with the acquisition of four equipped with torpedoes: the so-called R-1, R-2, R-3, and R-4 submarines, which served until the 1950s.
- In 1920, the Ministry of the Navy was created, thus becoming independent from the Ministry of War. In 1929, it was renamed the Ministry of the Navy and Aviation.
- Parachuting began on January 25, 1925, when the young Italian Humberto Ree jumped from a height of 2000 m onto the Las Palmas landing field. On May 16, 1928, Commander Fernando Melgar, director of the Las Palmas School, jumped from a similar height, being the first Peruvian to accomplish that feat. Years later, during the war with Ecuador in 1941, Peru was the first country in the Americas to carry out a military paratrooper operation in Puerto Bolívar.
- In 1929 the Peruvian Aviation Cross decoration was created.

=== Healthcare ===
- Yellow fever was eradicated with the assistance of the Rockefeller Foundation.
- The Anti-tuberculosis League was founded to prevent and cure this disease.
- The Child Defence Board was established for the protection of children.
- The Cancer Institute was founded.
- The Technical Health Office was established as a dependency of the Public Health branch.
- Various hospitals were built. In Lima, Archbishop Loayza National Hospital was built on Alfonso Ugarte Avenue, initially providing preferential care for women, and on Brazil Avenue the modern Julia Swayne de Leguía Children's Hospital was built. Until then, sick children were admitted to normal hospitals. The new children's hospital greatly improved the care of the city's youth, and was designed to also have free healthcare.
- To ensure the health and safety of the worker, the Industrial Hygiene Directorate was established.
- The National Antivenereal League was founded.
- A great sanitation work was carried out at the national level. Water and sewage services were inaugurated in Cuzco, Miraflores, Magdalena Vieja, Magdalena del Mar, and San Miguel. A drinking water network was installed in Arequipa, and similar works in Puno, Pacasmayo, and Iquitos began.

=== Foreign policy ===
Leguía, continuing his policy of defining international borders initiated in his first government (1908–1912), promoted the definitive border treaties with Colombia and Chile. These treaties proved controversial, as Leguía was accused of gratuitously handing over territory.

==== Arrangement with Colombia ====
The border established by the 1922 treaty.

Leguía began talks with Colombia to definitively resolve the border issue, which was reaching a 100-year mark, since it dated back to the time of independence. Colombia aspired to legitimise its border from the Caquetá River to the Putumayo River (a territorial strip that Peru actually occupied thanks to the actions of the Peruvian rubber tappers), as well as obtain access to the Amazon River.

Previous Peruvian governments had refused to give in to Colombian claims, but Leguía, in his obsession to resolve the dispute once and for all, promoted the Salomón–Lozano Treaty, which was signed in Lima by the Peruvian Foreign Minister Alberto Salomón and the Colombian Minister Fabio Lozano Torrijos on March 24, 1922. This meant ceding to Colombia an extensive territorial portion between the Caquetá and Putumayo rivers (a disputed area) and the so-called Amazon Trapeze, where the Peruvian population of Leticia was located, along the Amazon River. In this way, Colombia gained access to this river, which until then was only shared by Peru and Brazil. In compensation, Peru received the so-called Sucumbíos Triangle, which, in practice, it did not occupy and which it would eventually cede to Ecuador through the Rio Protocol, signed in 1942.

The treaty was approved by the Congress submissive to Leguía in 1927 and was put into execution on August 17, 1930, a few days before Leguía's downfall. When the treaty was made public, it provoked great resistance among the Peruvians who lived in the affected areas, thus arising a conflictive state between both nations that would worsen in 1932.

It was said that Leguía signed this treaty with Colombia under pressure from the United States, which wanted to somehow compensate Colombia for Panama's independence. But geopolitical calculations must also have taken precedence in Leguía: with the treaty, Colombia was gained as an ally, which until then had been close to Ecuador in its claim to the Peruvian Amazon. In fact, upon learning of the signing of the treaty, Ecuador broke relations with Colombia. And a Colombian–Ecuadorian alliance against Peru would have had disastrous consequences for the latter, without a doubt.

Peruvian historians such as Jorge Basadre and Gustavo Pons Muzzo agree that the treaty was a mistake, considering that Colombia came out with a greater advantage in the territorial cession and that Peru renounced a policy of defence of its territory that had remained unchanged until then. This interpretation is the one that has been perpetuated in Peruvian teaching and the one that has originated the black legend of Leguía. On the other hand, in Colombia it is considered that it was a transactional agreement, that is, that both parties renounced their maximum claims, made mutual concessions, and reached a balanced agreement.

==== Arrangement with Chile ====
Map showing the Tacna–Arica dispute and its solution.

Leguía also proposed to definitively resolve the problem regarding the question of Tacna and Arica, controlled by Chile since the War of the Pacific. As the years passed, the plebiscite initially agreed upon in the 1883 Treaty of Ancón to decide the fate of the Peruvian provinces became unattainable.

When the dispute was submitted to the arbitration of U.S. President Calvin Coolidge, he gave his ruling (award) on March 4, 1925, resolving to hold the plebiscite. This award was not well received by Peruvian public opinion, too aware of Chile's behaviour towards these provinces, subjected to a policy of "Chileanisation" for many years. In fact, the American commissioners who came to supervise the plebiscite, Generals John J. Pershing and William Lassiter, verified that it was impracticable due to the lack of minimum conditions for a fair and objective popular consultation.

The plebiscite did not take place, and both parties returned to direct negotiations, which culminated in the treaty signed on June 3, 1929, in Lima, between the Peruvian chancellor Pedro José Rada y Gamio and the Chilean representative Emiliano Figueroa Larraín. Both parties definitively renounced the holding of the plebiscite with the following arrangement: Tacna would return to Peru, but Chile would keep Arica. In addition, other concessions were granted to Peru in Arica, such as a dock and its customs infrastructure, possession of the Casa Bolognesi, possession of the Tacna–Arica railway station and the route of its line, the water sources of the Uchusuma and Maure, among other easements.

On August 28, 1929, Tacna was reincorporated into Peru.

=== Education and culture ===
- A vast educational plan was developed, counting not only on the corresponding item from the general budget of the republic but also on income from the beer tax, applied in Lima, Callao, and other seaside resorts.
- State schools were provided with teaching materials.
- National schools were created in the provinces: one for men in Iquitos and others for women in Cajamarca, Huaraz, Trujillo, and Puno. In 1928, the first National Women's College was founded in Lima.
- A School of Arts and Crafts was created in Cajamarca and another in Cuzco.
- The Men's Normal School was transformed into a Pedagogical Institute for the training of secondary education teachers.
- Industrial schools were created in Iquitos, Huaraz, Pomabamba, Moquegua, Yurimaguas, and Lima, and normal schools for Indians in Cuzco and Huancayo.
- The Larco Herrera Archaeological Museum was inaugurated, and the Bolivarian Museum was organised. The state acquired the Brüning Museum of Lambayeque.
- The National Archaeology Board was established to guard the remains of pre-Hispanic cultures.
- School libraries were increased, and school breakfast was implemented.
- The competition system was established for the provision of positions within the teaching ranks.
- In the field of higher education, the desire for reform exploded among university students, who approached the working-class sectors to form a fraternity. One of the student leaders was Víctor Raúl Haya de la Torre. The students demanded a series of reforms, such as the removal of incompetent teachers and the participation of students in the university council. In 1920, the first student Congress was held in Cuzco, chaired by Haya. The González Prada popular universities were also created. Although the government supported many of the students' requests, it also committed a series of attacks against university autonomy that led to the recess of the University of San Marcos until 1922.
- At the University of San Marcos, the Faculty of Economic Sciences was created, which replaced the Faculty of Political and Administrative Sciences.
- It was in this period that the literary and artistic movement known as Indigenismo manifested itself. Peruvian literature shone with figures such as Ventura García Calderón, Enrique López Albújar, César Vallejo, Alcides Spelucin, Carlos Oquendo de Amat, Alberto Hidalgo, Alberto Guillén, among others. In history and sociology, Luis E. Valcárcel, José Carlos Mariátegui, and Víctor Raúl Haya de la Torre stand out, and in painting, José Sabogal.

== Cabinet ==
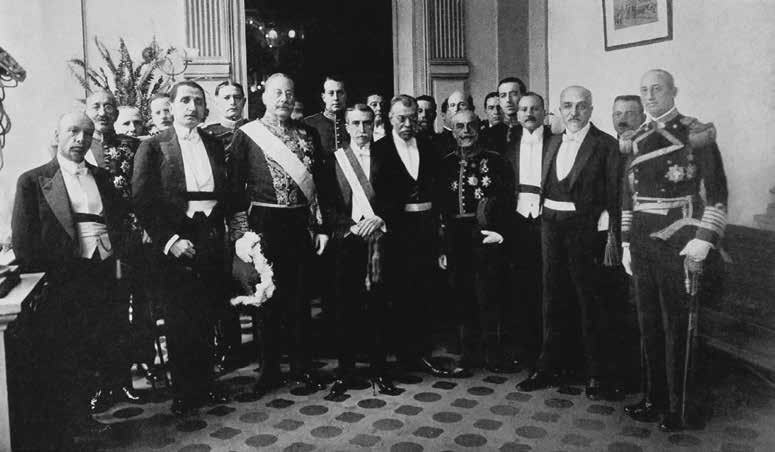
Leguía's cabinet at the Spanish Embassy in 1921.

Ministry	Ministers	Period	
Ministry	Ministers	Term start	Term end
Presidency of the Council of Ministers	Mariano H. Cornejo	July 4, 1919	August 24, 1919
Presidency of the Council of Ministers	Melitón Porras Osores	August 25, 1919	December 6, 1919
Presidency of the Council of Ministers	Germán Leguía y Martínez	December 6, 1919	October 7, 1922
Presidency of the Council of Ministers	Julio Ego-Aguirre Dongo	October 7, 1922	October 12, 1924
Presidency of the Council of Ministers	Alejandrino Maguiña	October 12, 1924	December 7, 1926
Presidency of the Council of Ministers	Pedro José Rada y Gamio	December 7, 1926	October 12, 1929
Presidency of the Council of Ministers	Benjamín Huamán de los Heros	October 12, 1929	August 24, 1930
Foreign Affairs	Melitón Porras Osores	July 4, 1919	August 30, 1920
Foreign Affairs	Germán Leguía y Martínez	August 31, 1920	October 1, 1920
Foreign Affairs	Alberto Salomón Osorio	October 1, 1920	March 18, 1921
Foreign Affairs	Germán Leguía y Martínez	March 18, 1921	April 4, 1921
Foreign Affairs	Alberto Salomón Osorio	April 4, 1921	February 27, 1924
Foreign Affairs	Julio Ego-Aguirre Dongo	February 27, 1924	April 29, 1924
Foreign Affairs	Alberto Salomón Osorio	April 29, 1924	May 4, 1924
Foreign Affairs	César Elguera	May 4, 1924	October 12, 1924
Foreign Affairs	Alberto Salomón Osorio	October 12, 1924	June 19, 1925
Foreign Affairs	César Elguera	June 19, 1925	September 25, 1926
Foreign Affairs	Pedro José Rada y Gamio	September 25, 1926	March 6, 1930
Foreign Affairs	Pedro M. Oliveira	March 6, 1930	August 24, 1930
Foreign Affairs	Julio Goicochea Álvarez	August 24, 1930	August 25, 1930
Finance and Commerce	Ismael de Idiáquez	July 4, 1919	August 12, 1919
Finance and Commerce	Fernando Fuchs	August 12, 1919	March 7, 1919
Finance and Commerce	Abraham Rodríguez Dulanto	March 7, 1919	May 5, 1924
Finance and Commerce	Marcial Pastor	May 5, 1924	October 12, 1924
Finance and Commerce	Enrique de la Piedra	October 12, 1924	June 19, 1925
Finance and Commerce	Benjamín Huamán de los Heros	June 19, 1925	September 24, 1925
Finance and Commerce	Manuel G. Masías	September 24, 1925	August 1, 1930
Finance and Commerce	Fernando Fuchs	August 1, 1930	August 25, 1930
Justice, Instruction, Worship and Charity	Arturo Osores	July 4, 1919	December 6, 1919
Justice, Instruction, Worship and Charity	Alberto Salomón Osorio	December 6, 1919	October 1, 1920
Justice, Instruction, Worship and Charity	Óscar Barrós	October 1, 1920	July 28, 1922
Justice, Instruction, Worship and Charity	Julio Ego-Aguirre Dongo	July 28, 1922	May 10, 1924
Justice, Instruction, Worship and Charity	Alejandrino Maguiña	May 10, 1924	December 9, 1926
Justice, Instruction, Worship and Charity	Pedro M. Oliveira	December 9, 1926	March 6, 1929
Justice, Instruction, Worship and Charity	Matías León Carrera	March 6, 1929	March 5, 1930
Justice, Instruction, Worship and Charity	José Ángel Escalante Fuentes	March 5, 1930	August 25, 1930
Government and Police	Mariano H. Cornejo	July 4, 1919	August 24, 1919
Government and Police	Alejandrino Maguiña	August 24, 1919	December 6, 1919
Government and Police	Germán Leguía y Martínez	December 6, 1919	October 8, 1922
Government and Police	Pedro José Rada y Gamio	October 8, 1922	October 12, 1924
Government and Police	Jesús Salazar	October 12, 1924	August 2, 1926
Government and Police	José Manuel García Córdova	August 2, 1926	December 26, 1926
Government and Police	Celestino Manchego Muñoz	December 26, 1926	December 24, 1927
Government and Police	Arturo Rubio	December 24, 1927	October 12, 1929
Government and Police	Benjamín Huamán de los Heros	October 12, 1929	August 24, 1930
Government and Police	Roberto López	August 24, 1930	August 25, 1930
Development and Public Works	Salvador Gutiérrez	July 4, 1919	August 1919
Development and Public Works	Matías León	August 1919	December 6, 1919
Development and Public Works	Salvador Olivares	December 6, 1919	April 27, 1920
Development and Public Works	Julio Ego-Aguirre Dongo	April 27, 1920	March 8, 1921
Development and Public Works	Pedro José Rada y Gamio	March 8, 1921	August 14, 1921
Development and Public Works	Lauro Curletti	August 15, 1921	February 16, 1923
Development and Public Works	Pío Max Medina	March 1, 1923	May 5, 1924
Development and Public Works	Manuel G. Masías	October 12, 1924	July 20, 1925
Development and Public Works	Pedro José Rada y Gamio	July 20, 1925	September 26, 1926
Development and Public Works	Celestino Manchego Muñoz	September 26, 1926	December 1926
Development and Public Works	Ernesto Sousa Matute	December 1926	November 25, 1927
Development and Public Works	Celestino Manchego Muñoz	November 25, 1927	October 12, 1929
Development and Public Works	Alfredo Mendiola	October 12, 1929	August 25, 1930
War and Navy	Carlos Isaac Abril Galindo	July 4, 1919	August 24, 1919
War and Navy	José R. Pizarro	August 24, 1919	1919
War and Navy	Gerardo Álvarez	1919	December 1919
War	Gerardo Álvarez	December 1919	March 1920
War	Gabriel Velarde Álvarez	March 1920	1921
War	Germán Luna Iglesias	1921	1922
War	Óscar Barrós	1922	1922
War	Benjamín Huamán de los Heros	1922	1924
War	Alfredo Piedra y Salcedo	October 12, 1924	November 1924
War	Juan Manuel de la Torre	November 1924	1925
War	Fermín Málaga	1925	1928
War	José Luis Salmón	1928	1930
Navy	Juan Manuel Ontaneda	December 1919	January 1921
Navy	Juan Manuel Ontaneda	1921	1921
Navy	Augusto Loayza	?	?
Navy	Fermín Málaga	1925	1928
Navy	Carlos Rotalde	August 28, 1930	March 1, 1931

== See also ==
- History of Peru

== Bibliography ==
- Basadre, Jorge (2005). Historia de la República del Perú (1822–1933) (PDF). Vol. 14 (9th ed.). Lima: Empresa Editora El Comercio S. A. ISBN 9972-205-74-6.
- Chirinos, Enrique (1985). Historia de la República (1930-1985) (in Spanish). Vol. 2 (3rd ed.). Lima: AFA Editores Importadores S.A.
- Contreras, Carlos (2011). Historia del Perú. Vol. La posguerra del Pacífico y la formación del Perú moderno (1883-1933) (1st ed.). Lima: Empresa Editora El Comercio S.A. pp. es. ISBN 978-612-4069-97-0.
- Guerra, Margarita (1984). Historia General del Perú. Vol. 11: La República Aristocrática (1st ed.). Lima: Editorial Milla Batres. pp. es.
- Guerra, Margarita (1984). Historia General del Perú. Vol. 12: La República Contemporánea (1919-1950) (1st ed.). Lima: Editorial Milla Batres. pp. es.
- Morimoto, Amelia (1999). Los japoneses y sus descendientes en el Perú. Lima (in Spanish). Lima: Fondo Editorial del Congreso del Perú.
- Pons Muzzo, Gustavo (1980). Historia del Perú (in Spanish). Vol. La República (1868-1980). Lima: Distribuidora Bazar “San Miguel” E.I.R.L.
- Pons Muzzo, Gustavo (1961). Historia del Perú (in Spanish). Vol. El Perú Contemporáneo. Lima: Editorial Universo S.A.
- Porras, Raúl (1930). Historia de los límites del Perú (in Spanish). Librería Francesa Científica y Casa Editorial E. Rosay.
- Orrego, Juan Luis (2000). Historia del Perú. Vol. La República Oligárquica (1850-1950) (1st ed.). Lima: Lexus Editores. pp. es. ISBN 9972-625-35-4.
- Rivera Serna, Raúl (1974). Historia del Perú. República 1822-1968 (in Spanish) (2nd ed.). Lima: Editorial Jurídica.
