= Alberto Salomón Osorio =

Peruvian diplomat and politician

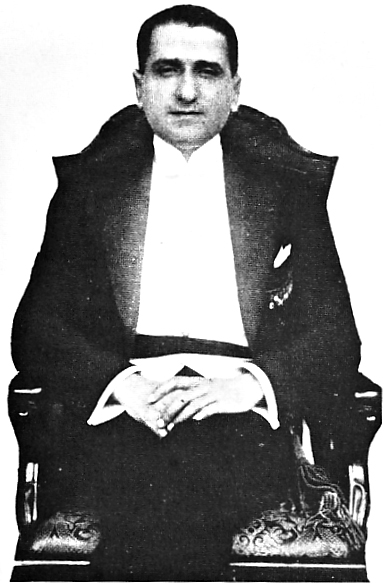

Minister of Foreign Affairs
- In office October 1, 1920 – February 27, 1924
- Preceded by: Germán Leguía
- Succeeded by: Julio Ego-Aguirre
- In office April 29, 1924 – May 4, 1924
- Preceded by: Julio Ego-Aguirre
- Succeeded by: César Elguera
- In office October 12, 1924 – June 19, 1925
- Preceded by: César Elguera
- Succeeded by: César Elguera

Personal details
- Born: November 15, 1877 Callao, Peru
- Died: April 7, 1959 Lima, Peru

Alberto Salomón Osorio (Callao; November 15, 1877 — Lima; April 7, 1959) was a Peruvian diplomat and politician.

He served as Minister of Foreign Affairs on three occasions, between 1920 and 1925, during the second government of Augusto B. Leguía. He is well remembered for having signed with the minister plenipotentiary of Colombia, Fabio Lozano Torrijos, the controversial Salomón-Lozano Treaty, which resolved the Colombian–Peruvian territorial dispute (March 24, 1922). He was also Minister of Justice, Instruction and Worship (1919-1920), interim Minister of Finance and Commerce (1920) and interim Minister of the Navy (1921), as well as deputy and senator of the Republic.

== Biography ==
His parents were Juan Salomón and Magdalena Osorio. He attended primary education at the Lima Institute and the Conciliar Seminary of Santo Toribio, and secondary education at the Peruvian Convictory. In 1894 he went on to pursue higher education at the National University of San Marcos, where he earned a doctorate in Jurisprudence and received his law degree (1902). He also graduated with a doctorate in Political and Administrative Sciences (1905).

While he was pursuing his university studies, he began publishing poetry in the magazine Letras de Tacna (1896) and in the biweekly La Neblina, directed by José Santos Chocano (1896-1897). He also collaborated in La Gran Revista (1897-1898) and Lima Ilustrada (1899-1900). He also edited La Vanguardia (1898) and translated the drama Cyrano de Bergerac by Edmond Rostand, for El Modernismo (1900-1901). He was admitted as a member of the Ateneo de Lima.

He also developed an important teaching career: he was a professor at the College of Our Lady of Guadalupe (1905-1908), and a professor of Political Economy and Constitutional Law at the San Marcos faculties of Political and Administrative Sciences and Jurisprudence, respectively (1905-1911).

In 1911 he was elected deputy for the province of Andahuaylas and re-elected in 1913. He was a supporter of President Augusto B. Leguía, then in his first government. When the coup d'état of February 4, 1914 against Guillermo Billinghurst took place, he ardently defended the right to presidential succession of the first vice president Roberto Leguía (Augusto's brother). Congress was not dissolved but its sessions were frustrated on three occasions due to lack of quorum. In one of them, on March 21 of that same year, there were clashes and street shootings, resulting in Alberto Salomón himself being injured, who had himself carried on a stretcher to the parliamentary premises, struggling to enter. In 1919, when President Leguía began his eleventh anniversary, he was elected deputy for the province of Andahuaylas, department of Apurímac for the National Assembly of that year, which had the objective of issuing a new constitution, the Constitution of 1920, even reaching to be vice president of his chamber. He remained as an ordinary deputy until 1924. He then was a senator for the department of Junín between 1924 and 1930.

President Augusto B. Leguía summoned him to join his ministerial cabinet and in December 1919, he was invested as Minister of Justice and Instruction. As such, he was concerned with prison reform and the improvement of the Guadalupe and Fortín prisons. He temporarily took charge of the Minister of Finance in February 1920.

His best known position was that of Minister of Foreign Affairs (from October 1, 1920, to February 27, 1924), a role he assumed after the resignation of Chancellor Melitón Porras Osores. He also temporarily held the Ministry of the Navy, in January 1921, due to the resignation of its head, Admiral Ontaneda, censured by Congress. After a short period of absence, he returned to the chancellery again, from April 29 to May 4, 1924, and again, from October 12, 1924, to June 19, 1925.

In his first period as chancellor, he signed with the English representative in Lima, Mr. A. C. Grant Duff, the arbitration protocol for the question of La Brea and Pariñas (May 27, 1921), complying with law No. 3016 of 1918 that ordered that said controversy be submitted to international arbitration.

In 1922, Salomón, who was more sympathetic to Leguía's policies in comparison to other politicians, signed the controversial Salomón-Lozano Treaty in 1922. After its signing, Colombia and Peru officially established their borders and exchanged strategic territories: Colombia obtained an entrance to the Amazon River through the Amazon Trapeze, while Peru de jure obtained a strategic exclave between the Putumayo and San Miguel rivers. Despite having ceded the territory to Colombia in 1916, the act was not recognized by the Ecuadorian government, however, since both signatory countries also had territorial disputes with Ecuador.

By the time the treaty was formally approved by Peru and Colombia, Salomón had already been definitively separated from the command of the chancellery and shortly before, from 1925 to 1927, he had served as legal advisor to the Peruvian delegation that took care of the preparations in Arica for the regional plebiscite, which did not take place. He then became legal advisor to the embassy in Washington, D.C., during the negotiations motivated by the frustrated plebiscite. From 1927 to 1930 he was senator for Junín.

After the fall of Leguía and the ascension of Lieutenant Colonel Luis Miguel Sánchez Cerro in 1930, he went into exile. Years later he returned to Peru and devoted himself to his private life. He was president of the National Association of Writers and Artists (1945-1946).
