= Salomón–Lozano Treaty =

1922 treaty between Colombia and Peru

Treaty of Limits and Free River Navigation between the Republic of Colombia and the Republic of Peru
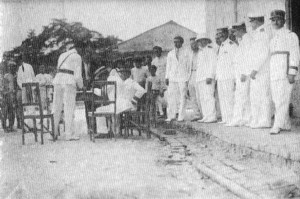
- The act of transfer of Leticia and other territories exchanged for the treaty in 1930 is signed.
- Type: Border treaty
- Drafted: 20 December 1927
- Signed: 24 March 1922
- Location: Lima, Peru
- Effective: 19 March 1928
- Signatories: Fabio Lozano; Alberto Salomón
- Parties: Colombia; Peru

Full text
- es:Tratado Salomón-Lozano at Wikisource

The Salomón–Lozano Treaty was signed in March 1922 by the representatives Fabio Lozano Torrijos of Colombia and Alberto Salomón Osorio of Peru. The fourth in a succession of treaties on the Colombian-Peruvian disputes over land in the Upper Amazon region, it was intended to be a comprehensive settlement of the long border dispute between the two countries.

== Background ==
The United States, which wanted to compensate Colombia over the loss of Panama, pressured Peru to accept a treaty that was unpopular. Peruvian President Augusto B. Leguía forwarded the document to the Peruvian Congress, which was approved on December 20, 1927. It had been signed on March 24, 1922.

According to Colombian historiography, the treaty required Colombia to cede to Peru the area between the Putumayo River and the Napo and Amazon rivers, an area that belonged to Colombia by the uti possidetis iure of 1810, as confirmed by various treaties signed with Ecuador: the Treaty of Pasto of 1832, the Treaty of 1856, and the Muñoz Vernaza-Suárez Treaty of 1916.

According to Peruvian historiography, the treaty had Peru cede to Colombia the entire strip between the Caquetá and Putumayo Rivers and lose around 100,000 square kilometers of territory that belonged to it from the uti possidetis iure of 1810. There, Peruvian settlements existed in the ports of Tarapacá and Puerto Arica, which had been founded by Peruvian settlers from former Peruvian territories of the same name that had been lost during the 1879-1883 War of the Pacific. The treaty included the town of Leticia and the valuable portion between Putumayo and the Amazon known as the Amazon Trapeze for the sole purpose of granting Colombia its own access to the Amazon. Losing the area made Peru lose valuable control over the Amazon, which it shared with Brazil.

== Treaty content and signing ==
Article 1 of the treaty states:

The border line between the Peruvian Republic and the Republic of Colombia is agreed, agreed and fixed in the following terms: From the point where the meridian of the mouth of the Cuhimbé River in the Putumayo crosses the San Miguel River or Sucumbíos, go up that same meridian to said mouth of the Cuhimbé; from there along the thalweg of the Putumayo River to the confluence of the Yaguas River; It follows a straight line that from this confluence goes to that of the Atacuari River in the Amazon and from there along the Amazon River thalweg to the limit between Peru and Brazil established in the Peru-Brazilian Treaty of October 23, 1851.

Colombia declares that by virtue of this Treaty, the territories between the right bank of the Putumayo River, to the east of the mouth of the Cuhimbé, and the line established and marked as the border between Colombia and Ecuador in the valleys of the Putumayo and Napo, by virtue of the Boundary Treaty concluded between both Republics, on July 15, 1916.

Colombia declares that it reserves its rights with respect to Brazil, specifically to the territories located to the east of the Tabatinga-Apaporis line, agreed between Peru and Brazil by the Treaty of October 23, 1851.

The High Contracting Parties declare that each and every one of the differences that, due to the boundaries between Peru and Colombia, had arisen up to now is definitively and irrevocably terminated, without any further arising that may alter the line of business in any way. boundary established in this Treaty.

As a result of a Peruvian attack on the river town of Puerto Córdoba, the treaty made both countries to scale back the number of troops in the region. It essentially created a border between both nations along the Putumayo River. Also, Colombia recognized Peruvian territorial claims to the Amazon east of Ecuador, including a new enclave granted by the treaty.

== See also ==
- Foreign relations of Colombia
- Foreign relations of Peru
- Colombia-Peru War
