= Fabio Lozano Torrijos =

Colombian lawyer, soldier diplomat, writer and politician (1865–1947)

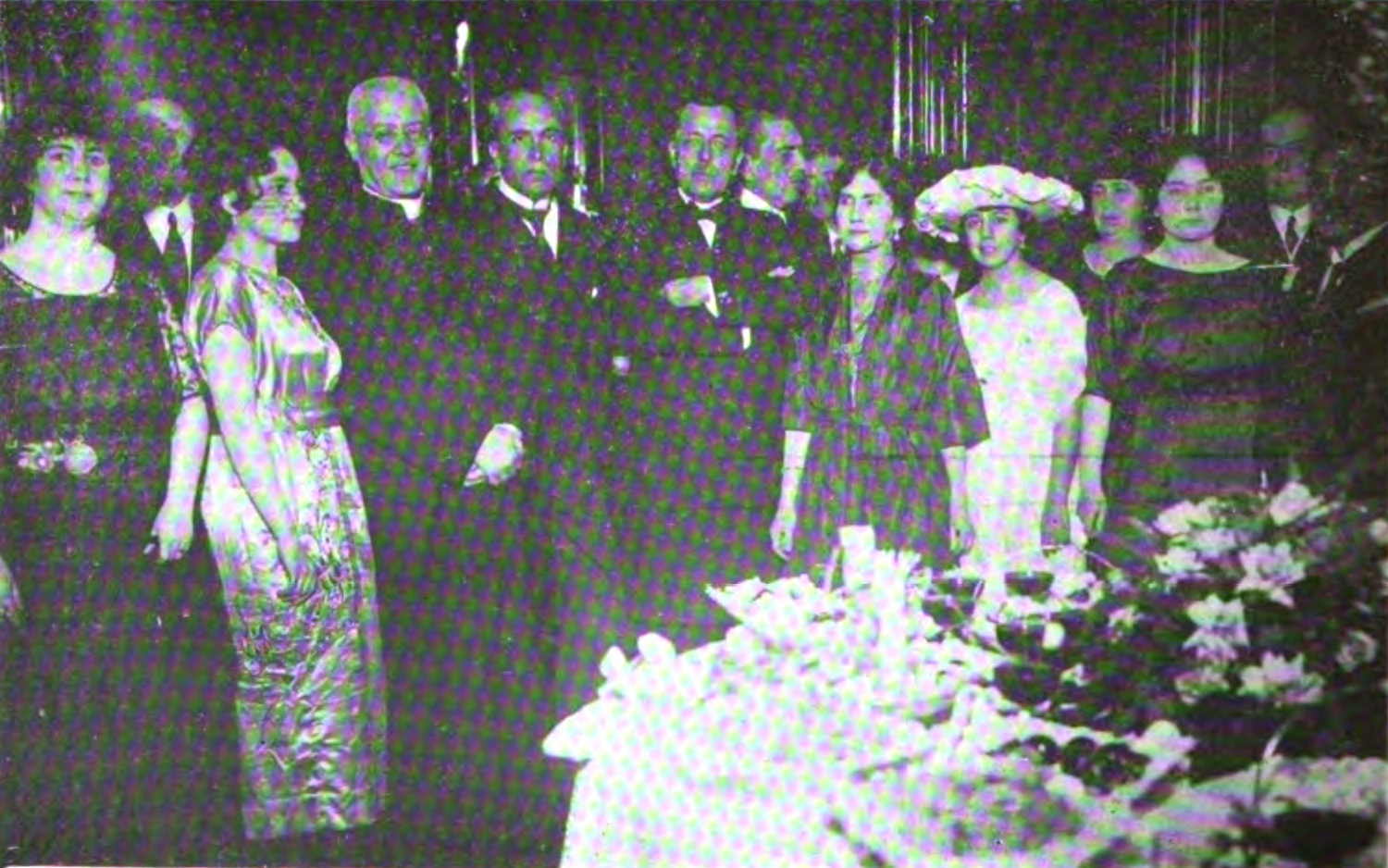
- Lozano (centre) in 1920

Ambassador of Colombia to the US
- In office May 30, 1931 – July 31, 1934
- Preceded by: José M. Coronado
- Succeeded by: Alberto González Fernández

Personal details
- Born: January 20, 1865 Santa Ana, New Granada
- Died: 1947 (aged 81–82)
- Party: Liberal Party

Fabio Lozano Torrijos (January 20, 1865 – 1947) was a Colombian lawyer, politician, soldier, diplomat, businessman, writer and chronicler.

He was born in Santa Ana.

He was a member of the Colombian Liberal Party. He was the leader of his party in Tolima, and a diplomat at the service of several Colombian governments, the most relevant being in Peru, where he was one of the signatories of the Salomón-Lozano Treaty (1922).

== See also ==
- Juan Lozano Ramírez, grandson
