= Third Militarism =

Period of Peruvian history, 1930–1939

- 1930–1939
History of Peru (1919-1930)	History of Peru (1939-1948)
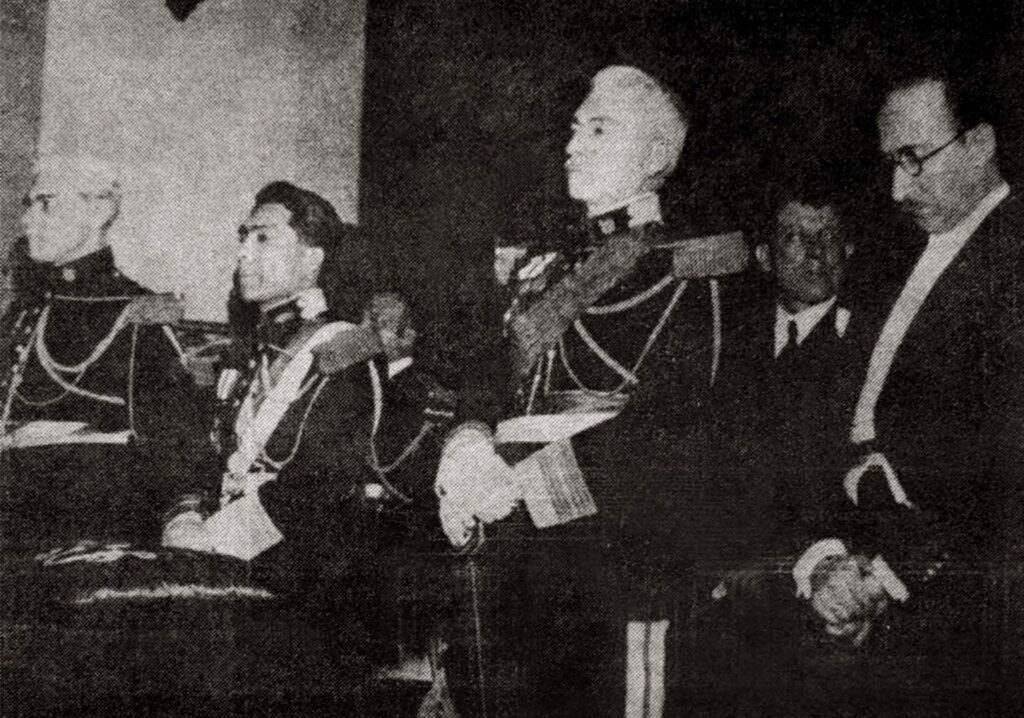
- Luis Miguel Sánchez Cerro, President of Peru from 1931–1933 (second from the left) with the other leaders of the 1930 military junta
- President(s): Manuel María Ponce Brousset (interim); Luis Miguel Sánchez Cerro; Ricardo Leoncio Elías Arias (interim); Gustavo Jiménez (interim); David Samanez Ocampo (interim); Luis Miguel Sánchez Cerro; Oscar Benavides
- Key events: 1930 Peruvian coup d'état 1931 Peruvian general election Trujillo uprising Assassination of Sánchez Cerro; 1936 Peruvian general election 1939 Peruvian general election

The Third Militarism (Spanish: Tercer Militarismo) was the period between 1930 and 1939 in Peruvian history, in which Peru was ruled by a series of military governments.

In 1930, dictator of Peru, Augusto B. Leguia, was ousted by military forces led by Luis Miguel Sánchez Cerro in the 1930 Peruvian coup d'état, ending his regime known as the Oncenio. Sánchez Cerro ruled Peru as leader of a military junta for 6 months, which oversaw the liquidation of the Oncenio and the rise of the left-wing American Popular Revolutionary Alliance (APRA) in politics. By 1931, he was forced to resign due to opposition from several sectors of the nation. After a month of political instability with 3 temporary presidents, David Ocampo assumed the presidency for 8 months and reformed the electoral law until elections were called, which Sánchez Cerro won.

Sánchez Cerro's 2-year presidency (1931–1933) was marked by heavy repression of APRA, through the use of martial law and arresting many of the party's followers, known as Apristas. In response, the Apristas conspired with dissident military officers and starting uprisings, such as the 1932 Trujillo uprising. In the same year, Peruvian forces invaded Colombia, starting a border conflict with Colombia which lasted a year. In 1933, Sánchez Cerro was assassinated, which led to General Oscar Benavides taking power.

Benavides' regime (1933–1939) was initially conciliatory and hoped to build a rapport between APRA and the government. However, discord between the two parties erupted soon after, and conflict began again. His term was meant to end in 1936, with a new president being elected in the 1936 Election. However, when Luis A. Eguiguren won with votes of the banned APRA, the results were declared invalid and Benavides' term was extended to 1939. For the remainder of his term, he focused on the infrastructural and economic development of Peru, which helped to increase stability. Following a failed coup d'état against him, new elections were held in 1939. Manuel Prado Ugarteche was declared the winner, restoring civilian rule in Peru.

== Background ==
=== Downfall of the Oncenio ===
In 1919, Augusto B. Leguía, who had previously served as president of Peru from 1908 to 1912, seized power in a coup d'état, establishing an 11-year dictatorship known as the Oncenio. From 1929, the Great Depression severely affected the Peruvian economy, which was heavily dependent on foreign trade and investment, particularly from the United States. Export prices for commodities such as copper, wool, and cotton fell by as much as 70 percent. The economic crisis contributed to bank failures and rising unemployment, which was further aggravated by the suspension of public works projects. Leguía's government faced growing criticism over its handling of the crisis.

Contributing to Leguia's downfall was how little supporters by the end of his regime. The army had turned against him after he ceded Arica to Peru and because it seemed as if he was favouring other branches of the military. Regional elites opposed him due to his decentralisation policies.

=== 1930 Coup d'état ===
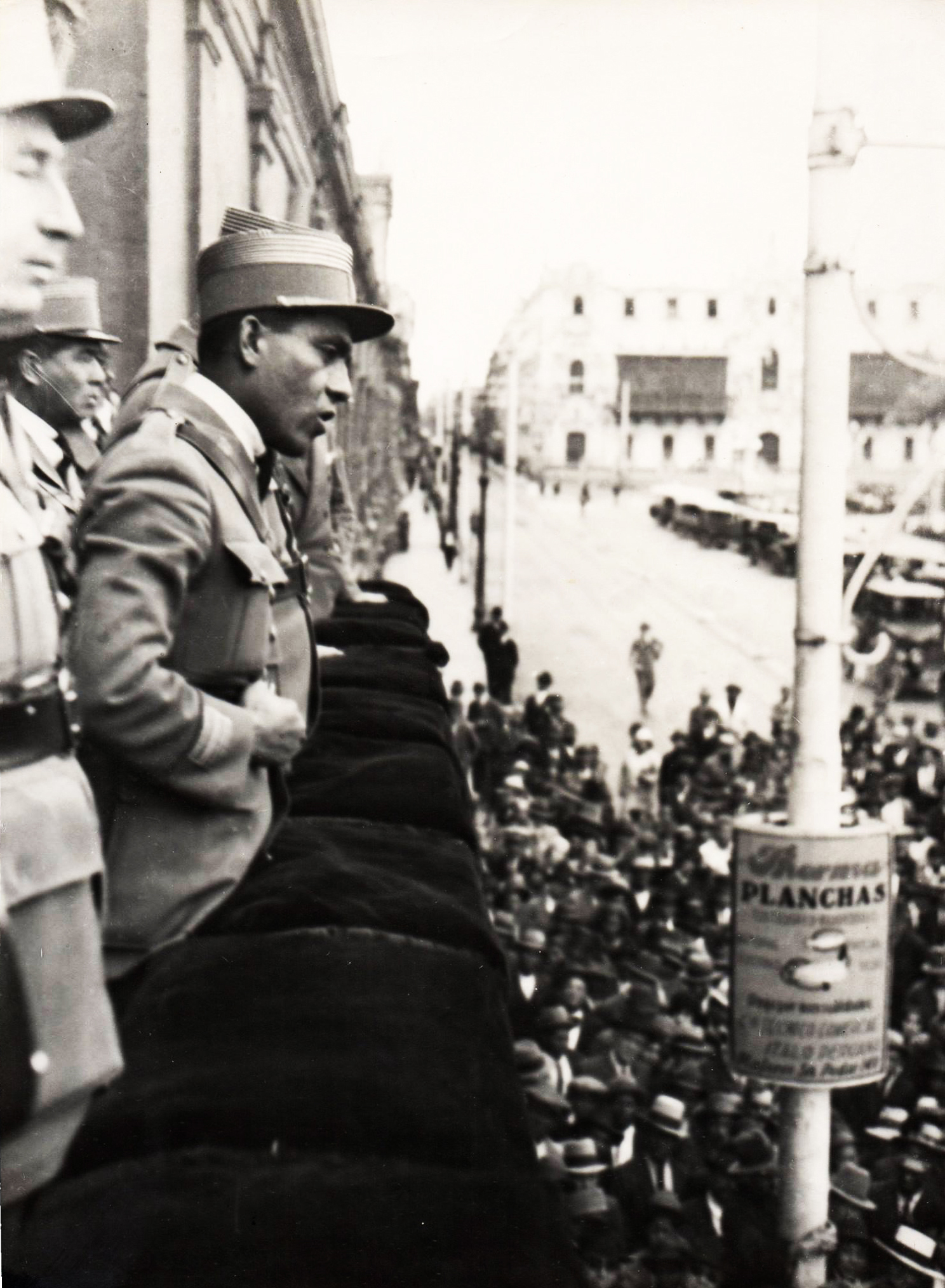
Sánchez Cerro addressing a crowd in Lima

On 22 August 1930, Lieutenant Colonel Luis Miguel Sánchez Cerro, with the aid of civilian political leaders in Arequipa, launched a coup d'état in the city, proclaiming himself "Chief of the Southern Army" and "Chief of Government". He made a guarantee that his rebel militia would ensure that everyday activities would carry on unaffected for residents of the city. He then appointed his secretaries who were:

- Major Alejandro Barco (Military Affairs)
- José Luis Bustamante y Rivero (Political Affairs)
- Manuel A. Vinelli (Financial and Administrative Affairs)
- Major Rubén del Castillo (Postal Affairs and Transmissions);
- Major Julio Arboleda Viñas (Transportation and Communications)
- Gustavo de la Jara (Controller General).

On the same day, a manifesto written by Sánchez Cerro outlining his political intentions was given out to the rebel troops.

Morning newspapers initially declared the government's confidence in quelling the rebellion. The country's official newspaper stated that: "The country returns smoothly to normal as if on railway roadtracks". Nevertheless, support for the rebellion began to unravel in Lima, the capital city. As rumors circulated that the entire south of the nation was in support of the coup, small groups of orators began marching down city streets and verbally insulting the government.

Garrisons in the cities of Cuzco and Puno quickly rallied to Sánchez Cerro's side, and opposition mounted against Leguía in Lima. He resigned and escaped Peru on the cruiser Almirante Grau, but returned to Peru at Callao, (for reasons which have been subject of historical debate) where he was arrested, detained, and later exiled from Peru.

== Military junta, 1930 ==
=== Overview ===
Sánchez Cerro's arrival in Lima was enthusiastically received by the popular masses; he gained their support and was elevated to the status of a national hero.

Sánchez Cerro had opposition from the upper-classes. Many intellectuals disliked him due to his lack of a political philosophy, while Aristocrats were still conscious of his partly-negro (cholo) skin colour, though it was a trait that enhanced his appeal to young members of the army. Sánchez Cerro was supportive of Indian rights in Peru, stating that he would "dignify and give homage to our Indian brothers." And that they would "constitute the heart of our national program, and not in theory alone.”

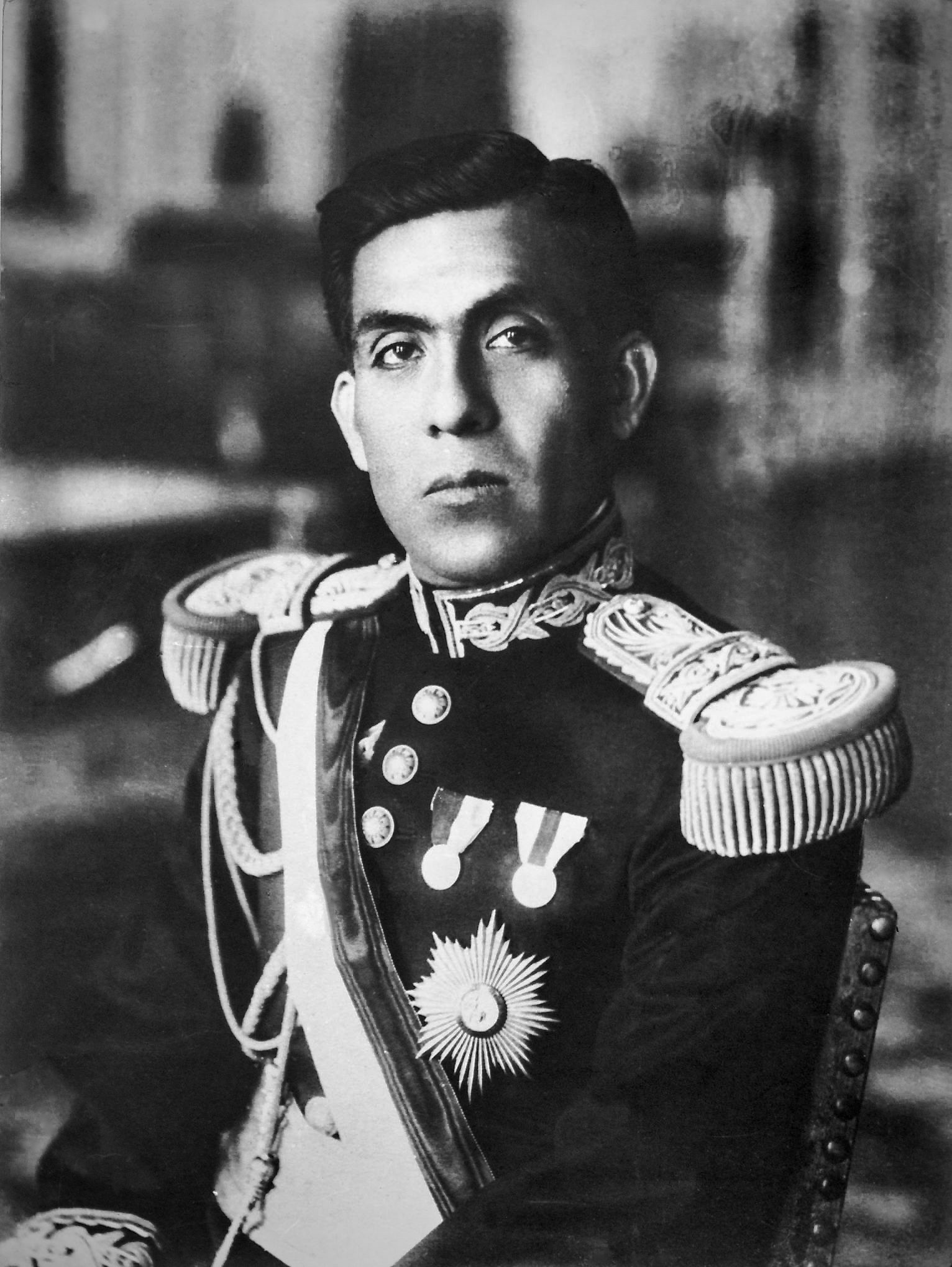
Sanchez Cerro

=== Liquidation of the Oncenio ===
With Leguía overthrown, the new government allowed exiled political opponents of the Oncenio to return to Peru. One such returnee was Victor Raúl Haya de la Torre, who had been a political opponent of Leguía and founder of the American Popular Revolutionary Alliance (APRA) in 1924; a leftist anti-Leguia party founded by Mexican students who had been exiled from Peru. APRA quickly rose to importance in the political scene following the aftermath of the 1930 coup d'état.

Civilians looted and burned the houses of Leguia's supporters (referred to as Leguiístas). Stoked by how press censorship had been used in the Oncenio, a witch-hunt began against its associates. Newspapers began a series of exposés against Leguiístas, with the most popular ones including stories of their corruption and wealth. The anti-Leguía newspaper Libertad directed by Fransico A. Loayza, had 70000 to 80000 copies in distribution at one point.

=== Acts of the government ===
Sánchez Cerro used Leguía's unpopularity to consolidate his political power. He imprisoned Leguía and his Leguiístas through the Tribunal of National Sanction, and made reference to the fall of the Leguía regime in nearly all his speeches.

Sánchez Cerro abolished the conscripción vial, a forced public work programme introduced by Leguia, which garnered him popularity among the native Indian community, as the programme had exploited them for labour. He criminalised enforcement of the road tax, a law that though repealed in 1856, continued to be enforced by large landowners; which also mainly targeted the Indian population which used the road for trade of goods. He also ordered gates along roads intentionally made to obstruct traffic flow to be demolished by local officials. Sánchez Cerro also gained popular support by legalising civil marriage and divorce, which passed with unanimous support despite protests from Catholic ranks and various splintered reactionary groups. These measures were taken mainly to ensure that the urban poor would support his candidacy in the upcoming elections.

=== Relations with APRA ===
Upon his presidential inauguration, several groups consisting of aristocratic elements were formed which aimed to remove Sánchez Cerro from power and install one of their own in the presidency. He was also challenged by Gustavo A. Jiménez, (later his minister of government) a pro-APRA political figure who shared the same motives as the party—in that—in order for Peru to solve its problems, the country needed to wage warfare against its upper classes.

After establishing a brief alliance with APRA against the Leguiístas, he was forced to repress it due to the influence of foreign firms which dominated Peru's export economy in 1930. In October 1930, workers in the Cerro de Pasco Corporation mining camps were unionised by the Peruvian Communist Party (PCP) and called a strike. In response, the PCP was heavily repressed as a result, and APRA emerged on the as the only viable alternative on the left-leaning political scene . Sánchez Cerro and his APRA-leaning minister of government, Gustavo Jiménez, were slow to respond, and as a result, faced a campaign of strong pressure from foreign mining and oil firms together with British and American embassies. Their aim was to have APRA repressed and Jiménez dismissed for his pro-worker sympathies. A clash broke out between police forces and the strikers at Malpaso, leaving a number of workers dead and triggering riots, leading Cerro Corporation to close down its company, and demand terms to the government. Still in the aftermath of the great depression, he had no choice but to accept these terms. Following the incident, he would continuously repress APRA for the rest of his term.

=== Relations with labour ===
Nevertheless, Sanchez Cerro's junta still attempted to appeal to labour in general. Following the Arequipa revolution, a number of progressives and radicals were given positions in the newly revamped Sección de Trabajo, with Erasmo Roca appointed as its direction of development. Included in its ranks was also Angela Ramos, a member of the communist party. One of the first measures it took was to organise a labour exchange, which would alleviate the growing number of those unemployed in Lima. In September 1930, it also approved the creation of regional labor inspectorates. This was born out of Roca's desire to expand the Sección de Trabajo out of Lima.

=== End of the military junta ===
Sánchez Cerro's efforts to arrange a presidential election brought opposition to his government and hostility from the press. Hostility also came from senior officers in the armed forces, who resented having to obey a lower-ranked officer. Some junior officers who had not been promoted after their participation in the 1930 coup'd'tat also felt indignant as to how they had been treated. The result was a series of military revolts which sprung up throughout the country in February, with participation from some parts of the former Leguía regime. Sánchez Cerro could not resolve the situation, and resigned on March 1.

== Political crisis and 'Ocampo's junta ==
Following Sanchez Cerro's resignation, archbishop Mariano Holguín assumed the presidency for a few hours before it was handed over to Leoncio Elías. Elías formed a Military Junta, however its unpopularity led him to hand over power to David Samanez Ocampo after a meeting on 4 March 1931. This transfer of power never happened as Gustavo Jiménez overthrew Elías on 5 March, but Ocampo's popularity forced him to hand power back to him on 10 March.

=== Ocampo's junta ===
During Ocampo's brief tenure, he reformed the electoral law in March 1931, by abolishing property requirements for voting and introducing the secret ballot, these changes expanded the electorate by 59%. He also transferred power to supervise elections from provincial authorities to departmental authorities. These changes reduced the ability of wealthy landowners (Colloquially called Gamonales) to dominate elections and opened more electoral prospects for parties whose support was based on the popular masses. They may have been made with the intention of improving APRA's chances of an electoral victory.

The law was not passed without dissatisfaction however, as almost the entirety of the national assembly voiced protest against it. The most frequent complaint was that the electoral procedures outlined were time-consuming, as voters would have to submit identification papers including fingerprints, a photograph, as well as birth, military, and work certificates. This lengthened the amount of time needed for voting registration and forced the junta to repeatedly extend the deadline for registration.

With the new junta facing popular resistance due to the departure of Sánchez Cerro, it was decided that Victor Haya de la Torre and Sánchez Cerro would both be urged to withdraw from the 1931 Election. Initially, Sánchez Cerro agreed, but after APRA refused to withdraw Haya de la Torre as their candidate, he reversed his decision and planned to return to Peru for the elections. The junta attempted to stop him by instructing the Peruvian consular service in Europe not to supply him a required visa. But when Sánchez Cerro insisted he would return with or without one; combined with the pressure of his popular support, the junta yielded.

=== 1931 Election ===
With most of Peru's traditional political parties extinguished, a new party, the Unión Revolucionaria (UR), emerged to back Sánchez Cerro. It was formed by his supporters, mainly Antonio Miro Quesada, owner of the conservative newspaper El Comercio. His newspaper carried out a series of attacks on Haya de la Torre and APRA, which damaged their campaign in Lima. Sánchez Cerro took an extensive tour around the country, which brought him to extremely remote areas of the country to explain his party's programme. It advocated for "hard work and sacrifice" and "acknowledge[ment of] the abilities of all races to contribute to Peru." He also called for the expropriation of the unutilized portions of large agrarian holdings, administrative decentralisation, a stable currency, and a balanced budget.

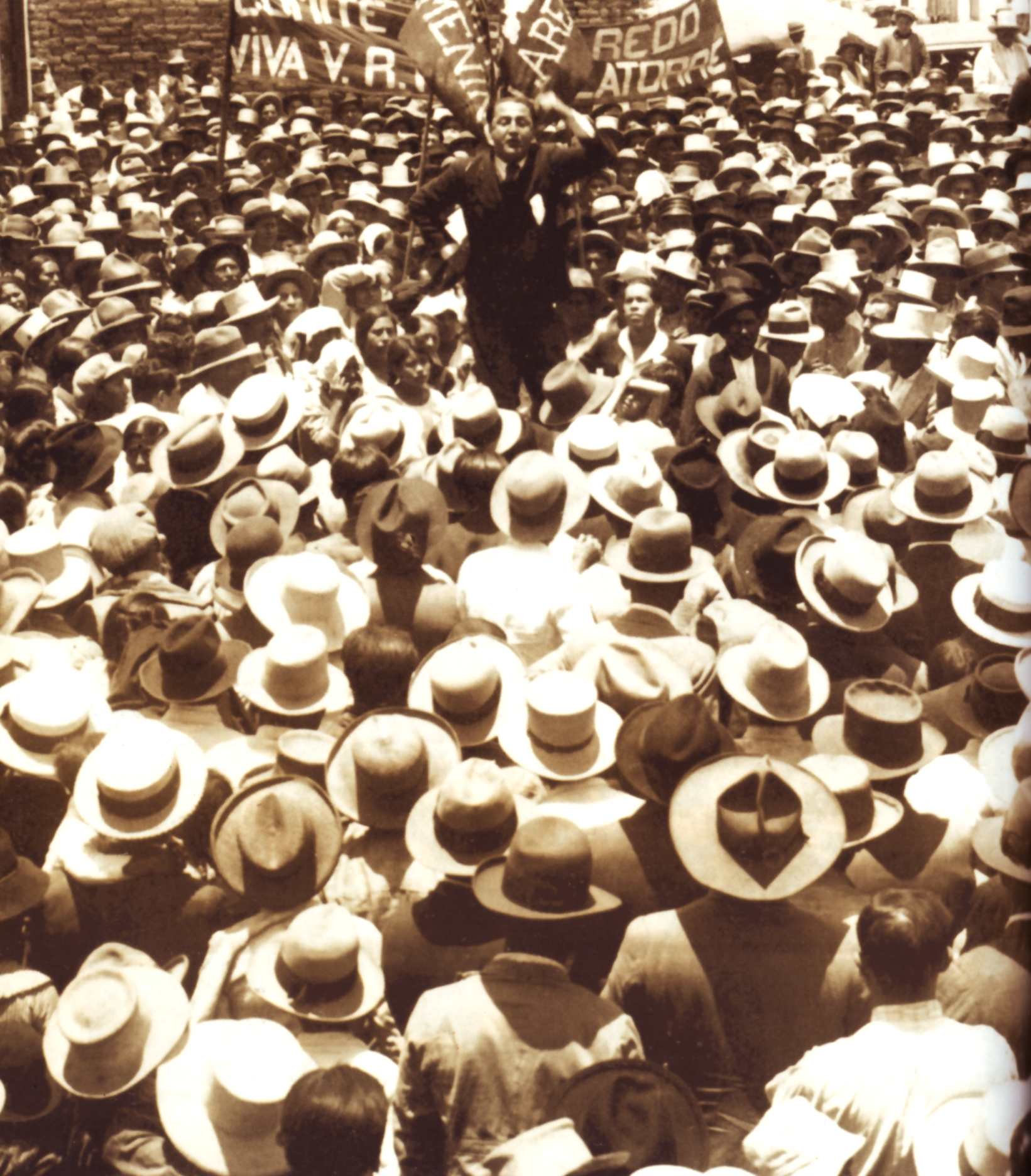
Haya de la Torre speaking to a crowd of Peruvian farmers

Haya de la Torre offered his programme based on Marxism–Leninism, depicting the upper-classes and the clergy as "black-hearted knaves" while denouncing Capitalism as well as foreign investment. He remained vague on specific economic policies to solve the economic crisis, other than recommending Bimetalism. The core of APRA's support mainly came from the middle class, small and medium-size farmers, and small businessmen who had suffered from the expansion of the Grace Corporation's holdings in the Trujillo region who Haya de la Torre directly appealed to. APRA hoped to establish a broad alliance of the middle sectors, urban working classes and Indian peasantry in the mountain areas. This alliance was never achieved, as many of Peru's farmers were unable to vote due to literacy restrictions. Haya de la Torre's rhetoric appeared unconvincing to many. The army also feared APRA, as it could have posed an armed challenge to them.

Nonetheless, APRA held a stronghold in the north of Peru, specifically in La Libertad, Cajamarca, and Lambayeque. This was partly because the party had secured support from northern upper-class businessmen such as Rafael Larco Herrera, whose sugar plantation was at threat of being overshadowed by Gildemeisters AG's large holdings at Casa Grande. Additionally, a large number of Léguiistas fell into supporting APRA as they would not be able to field a candidate for the 1931 election due to their internal divisions and their low reputation.

As the election day drew closer, UR rallies consistently outdrew those of APRA. Sánchez Cerro won the election garnering 152062 votes to Haya de la Torre's 106007, with 2 other minor candidates scoring around 40000 votes. APRA rejected the results of the election and alleged that the UR had committed fraud. The validity of these claims has been subject of historical debate. Historian Steve Steins doubts that the UR tampered with ballot boxes as the government junta had taken "extraordinary precautions" to prevent interference in the vote-counting procedure.

Sánchez Cerro was inaugurated as President of Peru on 8 December, at 1 p.m in the Peruvian congress.

== Sánchez Cerro, 1931–1933 ==
=== Internal politics, 1931–1933 ===
The APRA delegates of the Peruvian congress carried out obstructive tactics during debates. In the 1930s, APRA frequently attacked capitalism in general and foreign investment in Peru. It also attacked the influence of religion and declared that it was necessary to destroy "whatever Spain had brought to the country." In December 1931, El Comercio published documents allegedly containing proof of APRA's revolutionary plans. Anticipating that this would push the government to destroy APRA by force, Haya de la Torre called a meeting in Trujillo on 8 December, where he gave a speech which signaled to his followers to rise up against Sánchez Cerro's regime and install him in the presidency.

In response to APRA opposition, Sanchez Cerro declared martial law in January 1932. On 8 January, the government installed the Emergency Law, which authorized the executive branch to impose judicial sanctions, suspend congress, and close centers or associations. On 20 February, the University of San Marcos was closed under the pretext that its students had supported a communist naval revolt in Callao. In February, all 23 Aprista deputies in the assembly were deported together with Gustavo Jiménez. In March, an Aprista assassination attempt was carried out on Sanchez Cerro. APRA denied affiliation, stating that the assassin had distanced himself from the party, "realizing that violence was not permitted in APRA". On 6 May, Haya de la Torre was arrested. The next day, naval elements in Callao briefly mutinied before being quelled. Sánchez Cerro greatly feared APRA involvement in the mutiny. The sailors were court-martialed with eight of them being executed shortly after.

On 7 July 1932, APRA forces carried out an uprising in Trujillo. After 5 hours of fighting, APRA forces succeeded in taking over the city, and most of its pro-APRA civilian populace had been armed. The government responded quickly, ordering the cruiser Almirante Grau to Salaverry and bringing troops from nearby cities to quell the rebellion. By night, APRA's defeat seemed imminent. On 8 July, top-level APRA leaders fled the city. Many civilians continued to fight. The revolt was declared over on 18 July, with prisoner of war executions carrying on until 27 July. The revolt caused most officers of the armed forces to antagonize APRA, though the party now provided an outlet for those who were discontented with the regime to leverage change in the military and society.

=== Border conflict with Colombia ===
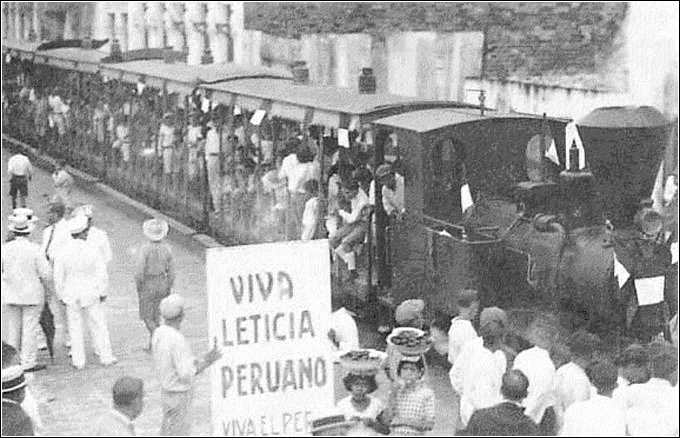
Peruvian protests in 1932 against the ratification of the Salomón-Lozano Treaty

Dating back to 1821, the Colombian–Peruvian border had been subject of dispute, sometimes resulting in military action. In 1922, the Salomon-Lozano Treaty was signed, handing over the port of Leticia and a large area of forest to Colombia, much to the dissatisfaction of the Peruvian populace. On September 1, 1932, about 200 armed Peruvians seized Leticia. On October 21, the Colombian town of Tarapacá was also taken by Peruvian forces. Sánchez Cerro subsequently nationalized the conflict, ordered the entire army to be mobilized, army drafting to be fully activated, and appointed general Oscar R. Benavides as the head of a military defence board with the duty of carrying out a military campaign.

=== 1933 Constitution ===
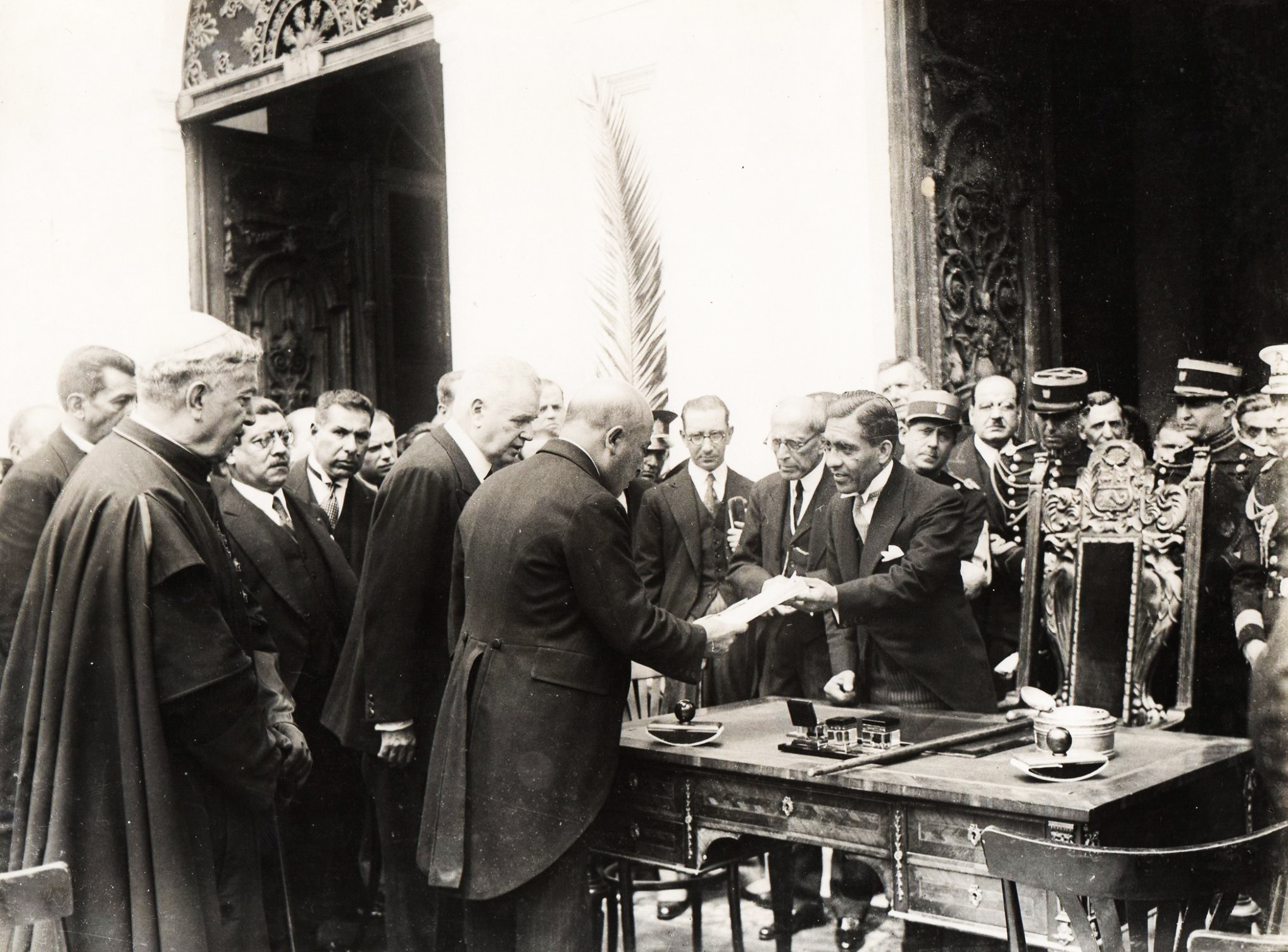
Sánchez Cerro at the ceremony for the promulgation of the 1933 Constitution

A major area of political debate within the country was in the new national assembly established to replace Leguía's 1920 assembly.

In 1933, a new constitution was charted, presenting some progressive reforms in the working class and regarding indigenous communities, while also having reactionary elements. The new constitution officially legalized civil marriage and divorce, and presented Roman Catholicism as the official religion of Peru (though recognising other religions as well). APRA chose to oppose women's suffrage believing it would empower the conservatives; and led an opposition to the church. Liberal forces feared that the clergy could influence women to voting conservative. Intellectual conservatives such as José de la Riva-Agüero and Víctor Andrés Belaúnde spearheaded a defence of the church.

=== Assassination of Sánchez Cerro ===
On 13 April 1933, while leaving the Santa Beatriz racetrack after examining about 25000 men who had been mobilised in the conflict against Colombia, Sánchez Cerro was assassinated by an Aprista named Abelardo Mendoza Leyva. In the aftermath, Congress chose Oscar Benavides to assume the presidency. This violated the 1933 constitution which stated that no active members of the military could assume the presidency.

== Benavides, 1933–1939 ==
=== End of the conflict with Colombia ===
In Congress, Benavides addressed the border war with Colombia as such:

Peru is not in a position to carry on a war with Colombia with any hope of a satisfactory conclusion. We will probably not be able to withstand the Colombian drive now being made on Puerto Arturo. We are isolated among the countries of the world and our diplomatic position is even worse than our military one. [...] I fear that all the countries belonging to the League will shortly withdraw their diplomatic representatives from Lima as a sign of protest; that there may likewise be an embargo on arms and possibly an economic boycott.

As chief of the military, he was aware that Peru's military potential was far outmatched by that of Colombia's. Benavides's began peace negotiations with the president of Colombia, Alfonso López Pumarejo. This ended with Peru and Colombia jointly accepting a proposed cease-fire prepared by the League of Nations to end the conflict. From October 1933 to May 1934, meetings for a permanent settlement were commenced in Rio de Janeiro, which resulted in a status quo ante bellum; Peru was to abide by the terms of the Salomón-Lazono Treaty. In the aftermath of the settlement, Peruvian forces withdrew from Leticia and the army was demobilised. Military officers generally supported this resolution after Peru's defeat at Tarapacá.

=== Split from Sánchez Cerro ===
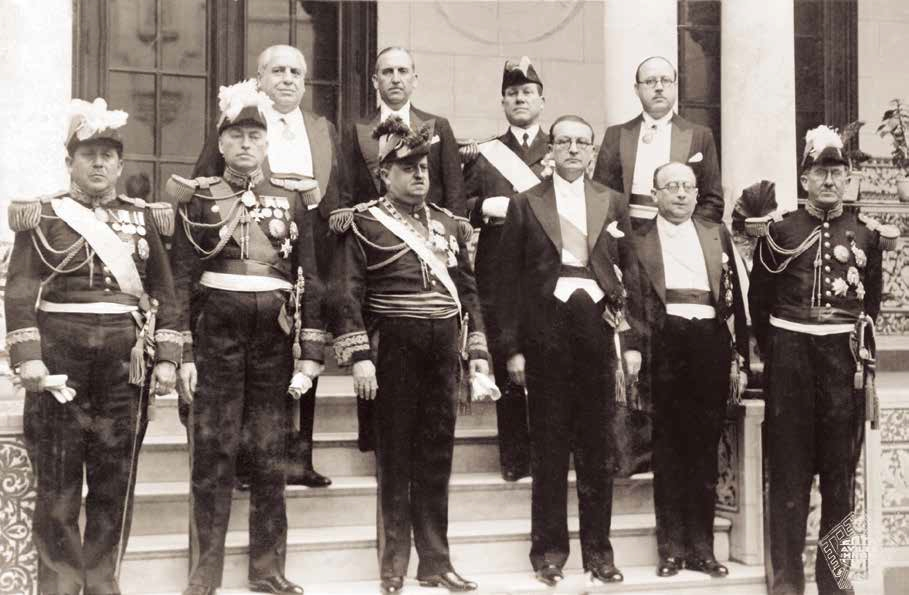
Oscar R. Benavides with his cabinet in 1933

Upon the beginning of his presidency, rumors were sparked accusing him of involvement in the assassination of Sánchez Cerro, along with allegations that APRA had conspired with him. At a press conference in Washington, he criticized the government's harsh repression of APRA. After Sánchez Cerro's assassination, he dispatched troops to the Lima Penitentiary which thwarted plans to execute Haya de la Torre.

The Peruvian congress, filled with Sánchez Cerro's supporters passed a verdict of support for Benavides' government as the legitimate successor of Sánchez Cerro's. But soon after, his policies drifted apart from those of the ex-president.

From 30 April to 2 May, he re-shuffled Sánchez Cerro's cabinet, repacking it with his supporters. He also removed his cousin as Minister of the Navy and Aviation in favour of Luis A. Flores, which was seen as an effort of Benavides to end Nepotism, which he had staunchly denounced during the Oncenio. The new cabinet began its first session on 3 May.

On 20 June, the trial of Abelardo Leyva came to a verdict, with the prosecutor, Julio Barrionuevo, dropping all charges against all accused of involvement in the assassination other than Leyva and Angel Millón Ramos (who was charged with appending the assassination). The resolution dissatisfied Luis Flores, who resigned from his cabinet, and announced that he would subsequently oppose Benavides' regime.

Operating under the slogan "Paz, Orden, Trabajo" (Peace, Order, Work), and promising an administration of "Peace and Concord" at his inauguration, he took a moderate and conciliatory stance to the country's internal politics, attempting to reconcile with APRA. His prime minister, Jorge Prado Ugarteche, served as a moderate and conciliator between APRA and the government. On 9 August 1933, a political amnesty was promulgated, allowing most political prisoners to leave jail or return from exile, including Haya de la Torre, who was also given a unique status of protection by the administration who wished to prevent his assassination. An issue of El Comercio published the day expressed indignance towards the amnesty, citing Sánchez Cerro's assassination as an "unforgivable act".

Sánchez Cerro's supporters were alienated from Benavides by his decision to end the conflict with Colombia. Between May and October of 1933, they grew militant, and launched various subversive actions against the government. Frustrated by the peace settlement with Colombia, a revolt broke out in Iquitos on 27 June, (two days after Peru vacated Leticia) though it was quickly quelled by local militia headed by General Fernando Sarmiento. The government did not exposit its causes and abstained from dispelling a rumor that they acted under the influence of alcohol, intending to leave of the nationalist issue of Leticia as resolved.

In November 1933, APRA held a large rally at the Plaza de toros de Acho, where Haya de la Torre made a speech with numerous references to Sánchez Cerro's assassination, though with some conciliatory aspects. The speech alarmed many groups that had previously been in opposition to APRA and acted as a pretense for such opposition. The size of the rally also gave members morale to take on a more demanding tone, which made its enemies antagonize it further.

Benavides' moderate approach also drew criticism from the UR, which had shifted to fascism under its leader, Luis Flores. The party used the newspaper Acción to promote itself and its beliefs. In mid-October, eight of its members were arrested for plotting an assassination of Benavides.

Benavides held 3 personal meetings with Haya de la Torre. In these meetings, and in the press, APRA made several demands to the government. The party demanded the revocation of the Emergency Law, full restoration of civil liberties, and pardons for all Apristas convicted of crimes. Most importantly, the party pressed on the reinstallation of all 23 APRA delegates who had been ousted from the legislature in 1932. Excluding the reopening of San Marcos University in 1935, most of these demands were never fulfilled. Though Benavides promised that he would not abuse the Emergency Law, and that congressional elections would be scheduled soon. The elections were postponed to September 1934, as the government reasoned that the current congress needed time to accept the Rio Protocol first. This caused tensions between APRA and the government to rise again.

=== Resuming of political repression ===
In July, the government demanded APRA to stop its plans to commentate the Trujillo Uprising. The party refused and carried out its rallies on 7 July, leading police forces to disrupt their rallies throughout the country. A new round of strikes led by APRA unions began. In mid-August, the party's headquarters and newspapers were closed by the government. As September approached, the Rio Protocol had not yet been approved, and the government delayed the elections to November. Late in October, Haya de la Torre was nearly killed in an airplane malfunction, where APRA accused the government of having rigged the aircraft. On 1 November, the election was delayed again, supposedly to purge fraudulent voters from the elections. On 2 November, the Rio Protocol was accepted by congress. Early in November, Benavides cancelled the election, leading to the resumption of Aprista and Léguiista conspiracies. Luis Alberto Sánchez, the editor of La Tribuna reasoned as such: "Nothing else remains; they push us to it."

From 25 to 29 November, a series of armed revolts occurred in Lima, Ayacucho, Huancavelica, and Huancayo. Jorge Prado was also forced to resign as prime minister in November due to mounting political pressure and opposition. Benavides' replaced him with José de Riva Agüero, an intellectual conservative, who advocated for harsh repression of APRA.

The regime arrested nearly 1000 Apristas, including many top-level leaders, though Haya de la Torre remained unarrested. Shortly after the rebellions were quelled, Benavides passed new legislation which increased penalties for political opponents and rebels of the government, while also passing legislation which increased his emergency powers. The regime outlawed Aprista and Communist worker organizations.

While elaborating on his new policy, Benavides remarked in 1935 that his old programme of "peace and concord", was ultimately "fruitless and unavailing", specifically outlining APRA as the main "agitator and disturber of peace", who he believed had been "fanning the flame of discontent and sedition."

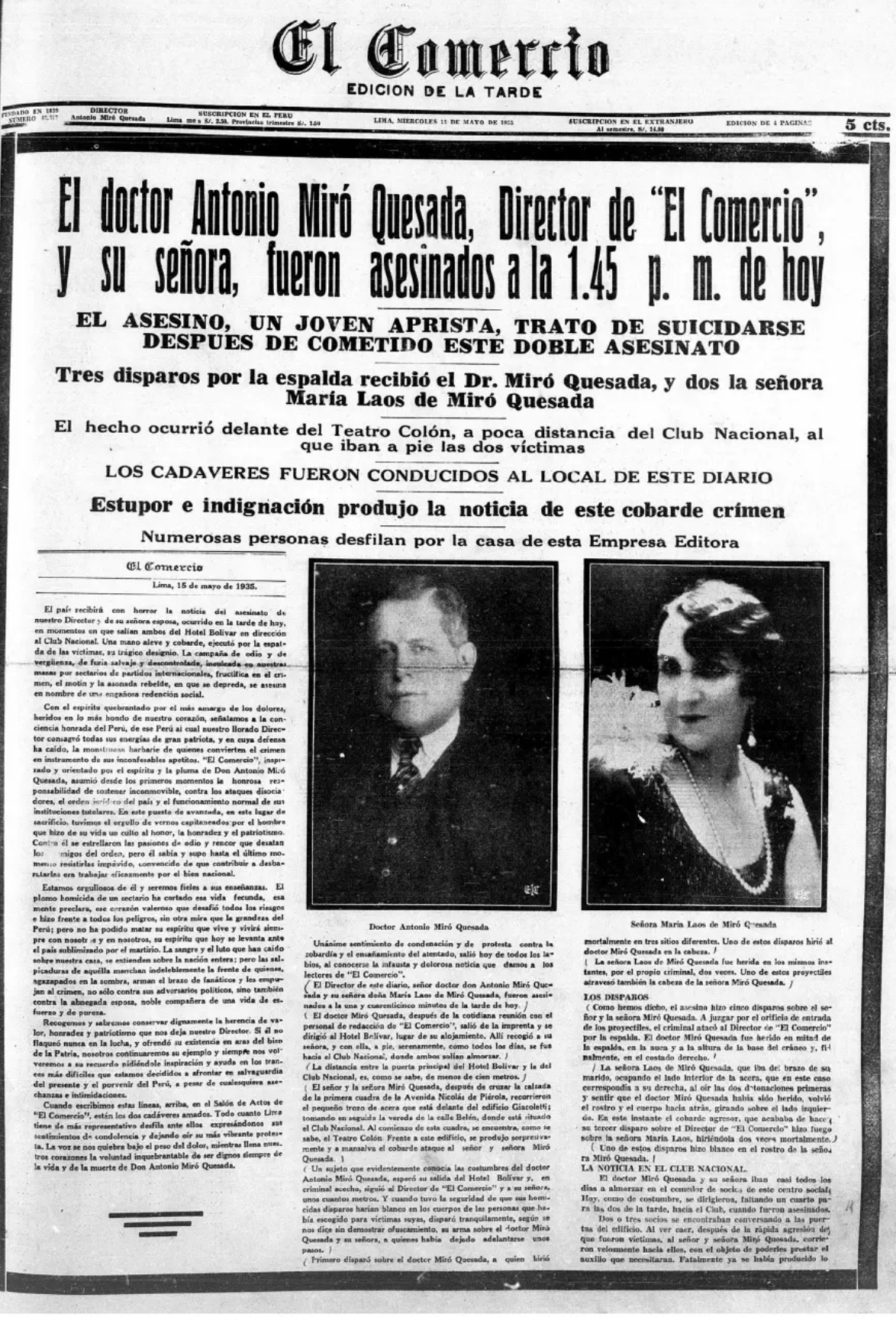
El Comercio headline on the Assassination of Antonio Miro Quesada and his spouse, 15 May 1935

In May 1935, Antonio Miro Quesada, the publisher of El Comercio, was assassinated by a man named Carlos Steer, along with his wife. Under the terms of the Emergency Law, the assassin was to be given a death sentence by a military tribunal, but was given 25 years in prison instead. This garnered more anti-Benavides sentiment among extreme conservative groups and began a conflict between Benavides and the Miro Quesada family.

The assassination was a major sign of escalating political instability, with Peña remarking that: "The assassination dashed any hoped of a fair election that would be conducted peacefully".

Benavides' term was to end in December 1936, at the end of Sánchez Cerro's term. The president declared that he had no desire to remain as president and scheduled presidential and congressional elections for October 11.

=== Annulled 1936 election ===
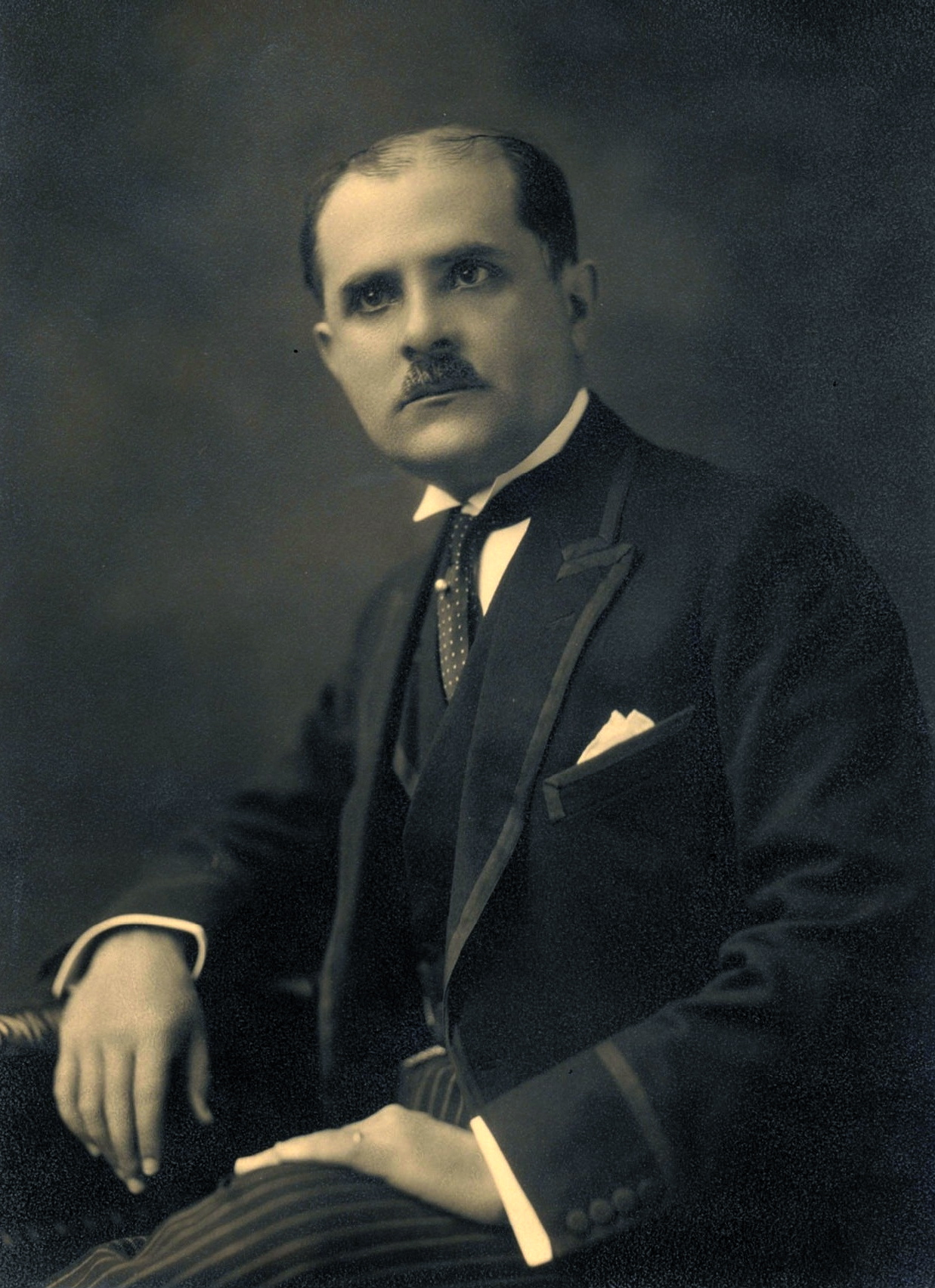
Luis Antonio Eguiguren, the winner of the 1936 Election. He never took office as the election was annulled.

Oscar Benavides hoped to form a broad coalition representing the center of the political spectrum in support of his favoured candidate Jorge Prado Ugarteche. As such, he formed the Frente Nacional, primarily made up of small political parties led by the elite and upper-class leadership. It included Luis Antonio Eguiguren's Social Democratic Front, Leguia's Reformist Democratic Party, and the Arequipa-based Decentralist Party. The alliance was very loosely united by the goal of achieving Liberal democracy. Benavides' aimed to achieve a peaceful transfer of power without repressing excessively APRA.

A moderate conservative with democratic views, he seemed capable of winning the election with the support of the center. However, the Prado family, which had been involved in the country's politics since the 19th century, had acquired many enemies. Jorge Prado's father, Mariano Ignacio Prado, had a tainted reputation for having abandoned Peru during the War of the Pacific. He attempted to negotiate APRA support, but was rejected by the party.

Jorge Prado was opposed by the moderate left and far-right, with Benavides' prime minister, the fascist supporter José de Riva Agüero, fearing that Prado would compromise with the left and eventually allow them to take over the country. Many on the centre, far, and moderate right who had no faith in Jorge Prado supported the intellectual Manuel Vincente Villaran, whose reputation was partly damaged by his extremist allies. His candidacy arose from an agreement between three political parties; the Acción Patriótica led by Riva Agüero; the Nacional Agrario led by Pedro Beltrán, and the Partido Nacionalismo led by Clemente Revilla.

His political assortment included the young and meritorious lawyer José Quesada Larrea, whose many connections empowered the prospect of an alliance with the UR. Many members of the UR also had close ties with members of Villaran's political team. But this alliance was never established, as Luis A. Flores was also put forward as a candidate for the UR, hoping that he would inherit Sánchez Cerro's mass popularity. The majority of his support was from the portion of upper-class who chose not to vote for Manuel Villarán.

Haya de la Torre also announced his candidacy in early June, hoping to demonstrate that APRA was not a violent, anti-military party. However, many members of the party doubted that the election would be conducted fairly and began a conspiracy with David Toro, president of Bolivia, to overthrow the Benavides regime. In exchange for supporting an uprising in Southern Peru with arms and weapons, APRA, once in power, would not defend Chile against Bolivian aggression. The treason of a high-ranking APRA leader in Lima led to the discovery of the conspiracy, and an exertion of diplomatic pressure on the Bolivian government resulted in the abortion of the plan in late August. As a result, APRA was barred from contesting the elections on 5 November when their application was presented. The government justified this action by citing article 53 of the constitution, which stated that international parties could not participate in elections.

Less than a month before polling day, APRA approached Luis Eguiguren, and convinced him to revoke his support for Jorge Prado. He quickly organised a coalition named the Frente Democrática with the support of APRA and the Peruvian Communist Party (PCP). The PCP initially intended to form a coalition made of Socialists, Communists and APRA members named the Frente Popular, but this was ardently refused by APRA. With his new-found support, Luis A. Eguiguren took an early lead and appeared to be the clear winner.

However, Benavides ordered the voting procedure to be suspended on October 21 by the National Election Board, and then installed a military cabinet led by Ernesto Montagne Markholz. He convened an emergency session of the national assembly on November 4. The assembly had previously been in a state of inactiveness, and he aimed to force it into being obedient to him. He presented the assembly with his solution to resolve the crisis; an annulation of the elections; a 3-year extension of his term; and the amplification of his powers allowing him to pass legislation by decree. After 10 days of debate, with Eguiguren also participating, his proposal was accepted by the assembly by a vote of 55 to 17, and the election was declared null, extending Benavides' term to 1939. For the remainder of his term, no congress would serve, and he was given full dictatorial powers.

=== Dictatorship, 1936–1939 ===
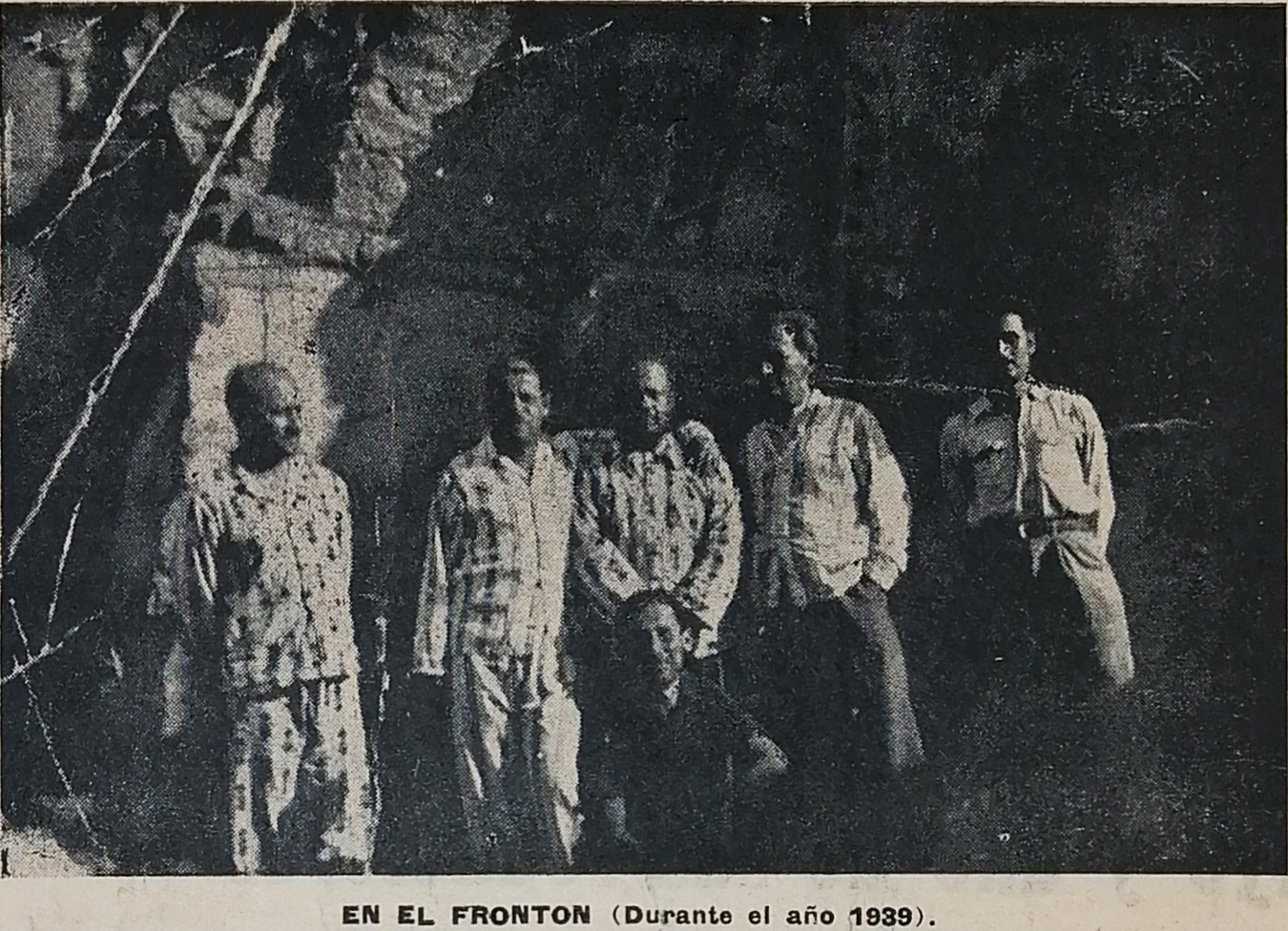
Imprisoned members of the UR in 1939

Using a system of torture and arrest, Benavides nullified any threat against the regime, ruling over a relatively stable Peru until 1939. Improving economic conditions as well as a greater understanding of the populace's problems helped in this regard. Paquita Peña de Benavides, in his second volume of El Mariscal Benavides (Note: The book was in collaboration with Alberto Ferreyros and Zárate Lescano) described the development of Peru during the Benavides dictatorship as "never ceasing", becoming "increasingly more significant and consistent".

Following the elections, failed attempts were made by both APRA and the UR to rebel against the annulation of the results. APRA attempted to seize a military base in Lima and a police station in Ancón district in October, while Luis A. Flores and General Cirilo H. Ortega of the Revolutionary Union were implicated in a plot to overthrow Benavides. Flores was deported along with 8 other associates. The UR still believed that since the vote count had not been fully completed, an electoral victory was still possible.

From 1937 to 1939, the UR would be in active opposition to Benavides, while also going through political fragmentation, with Cirilo H. Ortega leading his own faction against Flores' supporters. By 1939, the party was split into two camps.

Though APRA continued to operate underground, mainly in Lima while its higher-ups were in exile, it also gained a stronghold in rural areas like towns and villages. APRA's messaging and beliefs resonated with almost all classes in these areas, who had ideals of attacking corrupt elites who they believed had stayed in power for too long.

Through Law No. 8463, the executive branch of the government was allowed to assume the powers of the legislative.

For the entirety of his dictatorial rule, Benavides' had little political opposition, though he did not have support from civilian groups either. Although the regime was able to improve the quality of the armed forces, its loyalty was never entirely secured as subversion by APRA and other civilian groups continued. In September 1938, Haya de la Torre claimed that if economic conditions worsened, Benavides would quickly be overthrown, proclaiming: "The army will come to me for support, since I have many partisans among the officers, particularly the younger ones". At the start of 1939, many believed that Benavides would not end his term.

=== Government works and policies ===
Benavides embarked on several measures to reduce the impact of the Great Depression on workers and to reduce the appeal of APRA to labor forces as well as demonstrate the role workers could play in the industrialization of Peru.

Worker districts were assigned in Lima in order to address the poor living conditions of workers. Four were built, though they only managed to house a small population of workers. State-run eateries were also established to attack the problem of worker malnutrition. Benavides also supervised the passing of the a social security law for workers, which provided medical insurance and old-age pension for workers.

Exempt from these benefits were those not working in government classified "industrial zones" and many who made a good income; though the latter was not taxed for the programme either. At first, the government also was unable to mobilize enough facilities to cater for those insured. By 1939, 200 000 workers were enrolled into the programme. The government also made 3 new ministries; the Ministry of Public Health, the Ministry of Labour, and the Ministry of Social Foresight to supervise their respective aspects of the nation. Between 1933 and 1939, 900 schools were built, with an increase of 50% in the number of students attending secondary school.

=== Infrastructural developments ===
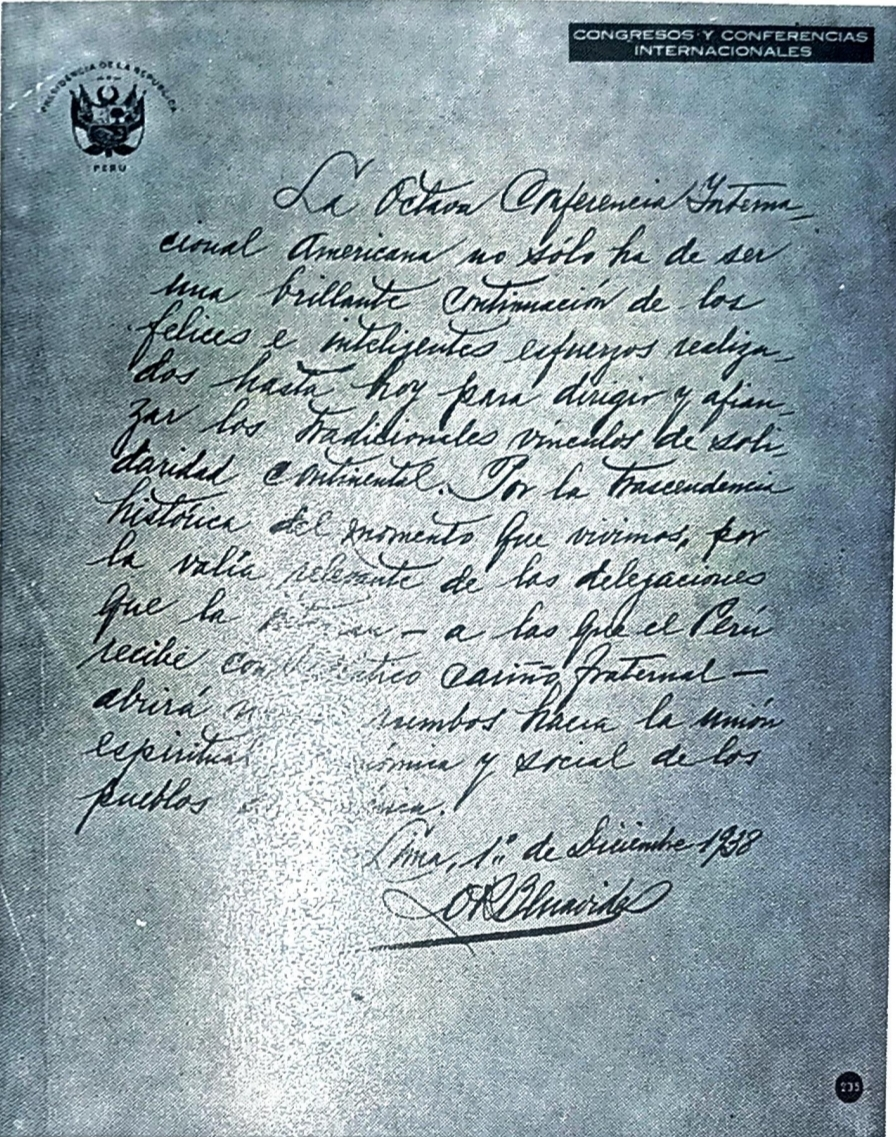
Document of approval for the construction of the Inter-American Highway in Peru

Benavides began a major highway construction programme, which he named the "plan vial". He aimed for the programme to connect Peru's major regions through a modern, national highway; and for it to be completed before he left office for concerns of abrupt termination of support from sponsors.

In total, 3700 miles of road were built by the end of his regime, with 40000 workers being enlisted in the project for his final 2 years. The result was a central highway which was able to connect many major cities of the country together. 2000 miles of road were also built in Peru as part of the Pan-American Highway, connecting its coastal cities.

Using funds from the agricultural bank, Benavides enhanced the country's irrigation system, watering about 130 000 acres of land and upgrading facilities which served 275 000 acres. Studies were also undertaken in order to irrigate another 400 000 acres, with considerable effort taken to supply water to the Sierra of Peru. The Bureau of Montana Lands and Colonization assisted in the project, beginning efforts to resettle farmers in Peru's Amazonian territory. Modern water systems were engineered for 25 provincial towns, a promise Leguía had left unfinished.

=== 1939 Coup d'état attempt ===
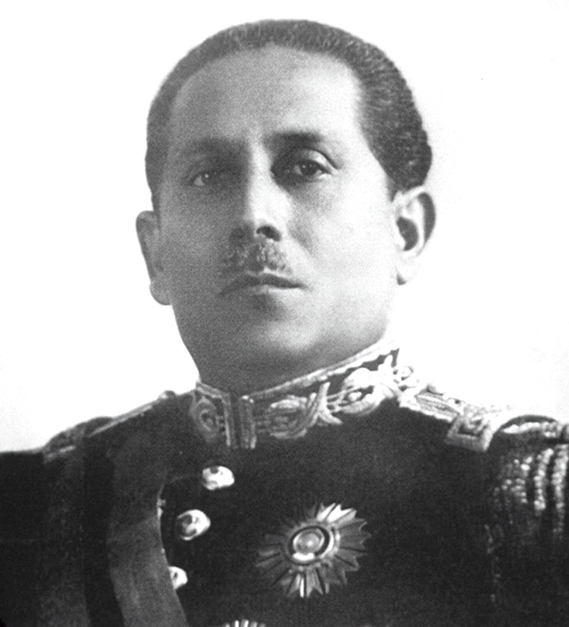
Antonio Rodriguez Ramírez

In February 1939, APRA and UR forces began conspiring with General Antonio Rodríguez Ramírez, a member of Benavides' cabinet, to overthrow the regime. Rodriguez intended to install himself as military president and allied with APRA in his efforts. The party decided to join the conspiracy when it failed to convince colonel Eloy G. Ureta to lead a revolution against Benavides. The coup aimed to restore participation of all political parties in the country's politics and to guarantee amnesty to prepare for the upcoming 1939 Elections. Upon overthrowing Benavides, he would then set up a provisional coalition government with members of all political stripes.

In preparation for the coup, Rodriguez launched a campaign of spreading misinformation and confusion among high-ranking government officials in order to bring alarm.

He launched his coup on the morning of 19 February, after Benavides had departed for a holiday in Ica. The coup had widespread support, with all branches of the military participating, together with police forces and the Guardia Civil. In the first hours of the coup, Rodriguez attempted to use his position as minister of government and police to secure military control of Lima. Masterson regards this as a tactical error, as he did so before securing civilian support for his coup in other areas of the country. As a result, confusion spread throughout military and civilian insurgents, preventing the coup from being activated simultaneously. A consequence of this confusion was that most of the subverted military forces believed that the coup had been aborted, and hence did not join Rodriguez in his headquarters at the National Palace.

Six hours after the launch of the coup, Rodriguez met Major Luis Rizo Patrón, along with other police and army forces. Rodriguez was unaware that Rizo Patrón was not involved in the coup, and was shot by the police captain. In the gun battle that followed, Rodriguez's forces were overwhelmed and defeated. A supporting movement led by air force Major José Estremadoyro Navarro at Ancón was also suppressed.

Haya de la Torre made no mention of APRA involvement in the coup; 200 APRA members were expected to participate, but none came. APRA leader Luis Alberto Sánchez stated to the Argentinian newspaper Critica that Rodríguez "represented a sector of the Peruvian right-wing; as an aide-de-camp to Sánchez Cerro."

=== 1939 plebiscite and election ===
With due anticipation, on 27 March 1939, Benavides announced general elections to be held. As with the last election, he desired a civilian to succeed him. Benavides' pick was Manuel Prado Ugarteche, the brother of Jorge Prado. He was initially exiled from Peru during the Oncenio for his opposition to Leguía, but returned in 1933, and became politically loyal to the Benavides government. Benavides once again formed a coalition in support of his favored candidate, named the Concentración Nacional.

A plebiscite was also held in June, which if approved by the populace would:

- Lengthen the presidential term from 4 years to 6 years
- Lengthen the congressional tenure from 5 years to 6 years.
- Prevent parliament from being able to impose or abolish taxes without the president's approval
- Reduce parliamentary powers to investigate the executive branch
- Broaden the president's decree powers
- Allow the president to veto legislation

The president's proposal was held on 18 June and accepted by the plebiscite with 87.83% of the vote despite opposition from APRA and some junior army officers.

The Concentration Naciónal was made out of non-fascist and anti-fascist sectors which included industrialists and moderate members of the oligarchy. They promoted greater expenditure of the state, capital investment in the industry and liberalisation of the political scene.

The opposition was represented by José Quesada Larrea, who formed the Frente Patriótica. He was described as "weak" and "ineffectual" by Frederick B. Pike. The party had the support of Vincente Villaran and his conservative associates as well as Luis Flores (in-exile) and his faction of the UR. Their ranks included the oligarchical right led by cotton planter Pedro Beltrán, which advocated for free-market policies and an authoritarian state. After purchasing the newspaper La Prensa, Quesada Larrea used it as a vehicle to attack his opposition and accused that Manuel Prado would be unfit to lead Peru due to his family background. On 20 October, the newspaper was shut down by the government which found its comments unacceptable, leaving Quesada Larrea bereft of a key instrument to promote his campaign.

Both parties approached APRA, who became considerably divided between which candidate to endorse. In the end, APRA ordered its members to abstain from voting, though some rogue members chose to support Manuel Prado through their newspaper La Tribuna. Ultimately, his strong appeal for moderation and staunch anti-fascism won the support of the APRA members who voted, as they believed he was more advantageous to the party's interests than Quesada Larrea. Ortega's faction of the UR and the Peruvian Communist Party also supported him.

On 1 December, Manuel Prado was declared the victor with around 263000 votes to Quesada Larrea's 76000.

== Bibliography ==
=== English sources ===
- Beals, Carleton (1934). Fire on the Andes. Lippincott.
- Bertram, Geoffrey (1991). The Cambridge History of Latin America: Vol. 8, Latin America since 1930, Spanish South America. Vol. 8: Latin American since 1930: Spanish South America. Cambridge University Press. ISBN 978-0-521-26652-9.
- Ciccarelli, Orazio Andrea (1969). The Sanchez Cerro regimes in Peru, 1930-1933. University of Florida. OCLC 13615421.
- Davies, Jr., Thomas M (1974). Indian Integration in Peru: A Half Century of Experience, 1900-1948. Lincoln, Nebraska: University of Nebraska Press.
- Dobyns, Henry F.; Doughty, Paul L. (1976). Peru: a cultural history. Latin American histories. Oxford Univ. Pr. ISBN 978-0-19-502089-2.
- Drinot, Paulo; Vergara, Alberto, eds. (2025). Modern Peru: a new history. Duke University Press. ISBN 978-1-4780-3252-6.
- Drinot, Paulo (2011). The Allure of Labor: Workers, Race, and the Making of the Peruvian State. Duke University Press. ISBN 978-0-8223-5013-2.
- Gerlach, Allan (1973). Civil-military relations in Peru. University of New Mexico.
- Hunefeldt, Christine (2010). A Brief History of Peru (2nd ed.). ISBN 9780816081448.
- Klaren, Peter F. (2000). Peru: society and nationhood in the Andes. Latin American histories. Oxford University Press. ISBN 978-0-19-506928-0.
- Martín, Luis (1974). The kingdom of the sun: a short history of Peru. Scribner. ISBN 978-0-684-13939-5.
- Masterson, Daniel (1991). Militarism and Politics in Latin America: Peru from Sanchez Cerro to Sendero Luminoso. Bloomsbury Publishing. ISBN 9780313368837.
- Masterson, Daniel (2009). The History of Peru. Greenwood Press. ISBN 9780313340727.
- Pike, Fredrick B. (1967). The Modern History of Peru. Praeger.
- Quiroz, Alfonso W. (2008). Corrupt circles: a history of unbound graft in Peru. .: Woodrow Wilson Center Press [u.a.] ISBN 978-0-8018-9128-1.
- Werlich, David P. (1978). Peru: a short history. Feffer & Simons. ISBN 978-0-8093-0830-9.

=== Specialized Studies ===
- Ciccarelli, Orazio (1990-08-01). "Fascism and Politics in Peru during the Benavides Regime, 1933-39: The Italian Perspective". Hispanic American Historical Review. 70 (3). Duke University Press: 405–432. doi:10.1215/00182168-70.3.405. ISSN 0018-2168.
- Ciccarelli, Orazio A. (November 1988). "Fascist Propaganda and the Italian Community in Peru during the Benavides Regime, 1933–39". Journal of Latin American Studies. 20 (2). Cambridge University Press: 361–388. doi:10.1017/S0022216X00003035. ISSN 1469-767X.
- Clayton, Lawrence A. (1999). Peru and the United States: the condor and the eagle. The United States and the Americas. Univ. of Georgia Press. ISBN 978-0-8203-2024-3.
- Doyle, Henry Grattan (1932). "Rebellious South America". Current History. 36 (1): 95–98. ISSN 2641-080X. JSTOR 45339961.
- Doyle, Henry Grattan (1933). "Pan-American Cooperation". Current History. 39 (1): 88–93. ISSN 2641-080X. JSTOR 45337240.
- Efraín, Manuel (2018-07-15). "Las elecciones de 1936 y su anulación". Revista de sociología. 26: 251–290. ISSN 1609-7580.
- Heilman, Jaymie Patricia (2010). Before the Shining Path: politics in rural Ayacucho, 1895-1980. Stanford University Press. ISBN 978-0-8047-7578-6.
- Molinari, Morales (2004). La Unión Revolucionaria, 1931-1939 : una aproximación a la historia del fascismo en el Perú. Pontificia Universidad Católica del Perú.
- Portocarrero, Maisch Gonzalo (1983). "La oligarquía frente a la reivindicación democrática: las opciones de la derecha en las elecciones de 1936". Apuntes: Revista de Ciencias Sociales (12): 61–73. ISSN 2223-1757.
- Stein, Steve (1980). Populism in Peru: the emergence of the masses and the politics of social control (1. print ed.). University of Wisconsin Press. ISBN 978-0-299-07990-1.
- Wood, Bryce (1966). The United States and Latin America Wars, 1932-1942. Columbia University Press. ISBN 978-0-231-02868-4.

=== Spanish sources ===
- Basadre, Jorge (2005). Historia de la República del Perú (PDF). Vol. 15. Empresa Editora El Comercio S. A. ISBN 9972-205-74-6.
- Candela, Jiménez, Emilio Iván (2013). El régimen de Óscar R. Benavides (1933-1939) ¿una experiencia populista?. Pontificia Universidad Católica del Perú.
- Molinari, Morales (2017). Dictadura, cultura autoritaria y conflicto político en el Perú (1936-1939) (Primera edición ed.). Universidad Nacional Mayor de San Marcos, Fondo Editorial, Universidad de Perú, Decana de América. ISBN 978-9972-46-595-6.
- Peña, Paquita, de Benavides (1981). El Mariscal Benavides: su vida y su obra (in Spanish). Vol. 2. Atlantida. OCLC 3849138.
- Pons Muzzo, Gustavo (1985). Historia del Perú (in Spanish). Vol. La República (1868-1985). Editorial Labrusa S.A.
- Rodríguez, Raúl Palacios (2005). Historia de la República del Perú (PDF). Vol. 18. Empresa Editora El Comercio S. A. ISBN 9789972205804.
