= Santa Catalina mutiny =

1931 mutiny in Peru

- Part of the Third Militarism
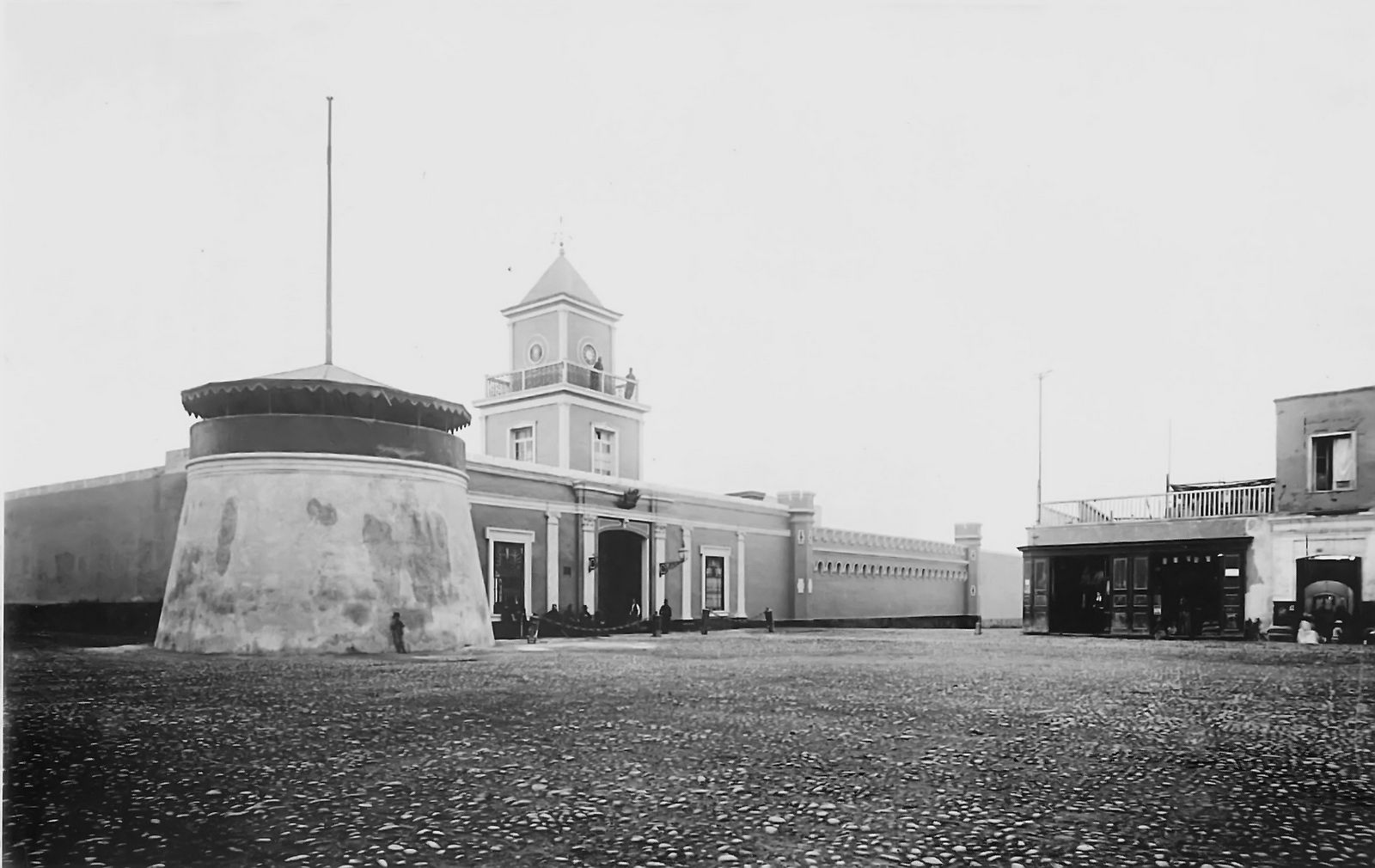
- The fort in 1902
Date	23 March 1931
Location	Fort of Santa Catalina, Lima
Result	Government victory

Belligerents
Government of Peru	Insurrect troops

Commanders and leaders
Gustavo Jiménez	Víctor Huapaya (executed)

Units involved
2nd Artillery Regiment; Civil Guard troops	5th Infantry Regiment

Casualties and losses
- 40 killed and wounded in total

The 1931 Santa Catalina mutiny took place on March 23, 1931, at the Santa Catalina Fort, located in the neighbourhood of Barrios Altos of Lima, Peru. The mutiny was led by Second sergeant Víctor Faustino Huapaya Chacón and involved practically the entire troop of the 5th Infantry Regiment. However, Sergeant Huapaya did not have any political objective and the mutiny was quickly defeated by troops under the command of the commander Gustavo Jiménez.

The mutiny occurred during the political crisis of the transitional government of the National Government Junta led by David Samanez Ocampo.

== Background ==
President Augusto B. Leguía, who had governed Peru for 11 years, was overthrown by a coup d'état promoted by EP commander Luis Miguel Sánchez Cerro in 1930. As a result of said coup, Sánchez Cerro began to govern the country through a Military Junta.

However, the downfall of Leguía's government caused a political and social crisis in Peru. The Communist Party and the Aprista Party mobilised and agitated the Peruvian masses, but mainly military uprisings and rebellions were the ones that predominated on the scene. national. Luis Miguel Sánchez Cerro resigned from the Military Junta in the face of an imminent civil war, and subsequently, several figures seized the presidency of said junta. Finally, on March 11, 1931, the civilian leader David Samanez Ocampo assumed its presidency with the objective of calling new general elections that same year.

== Mutiny ==
On March 23, 1931, the classes and troops of the 5th Infantry Regiment, quartered, at that time, in the Santa Catalina Barracks, under the command of Sergeant 2nd EP Víctor Faustino Huapaya Chacón, mutinied at night, taking the leaders and officers of said regiment hostage in the barracks dining room.

Sergeant Huapaya took possession of a sword and an officer's belt, then they left a small garrison in command of the barracks and took to the streets of Lima with tanks, rifles and machine guns firing shots into the air. In the military parade that they participated in, they occupied the Plaza San Martín, the university park, the towers of the Basilica and the churches of La Merced and Santo Domingo (the bells rang), but when they tried to attack the Ministry of Government and besiege the Government Palace They were repelled by the Republican Guard. At that time, the government gave the order to suppress the insurrectional movement that had been brewing in the capital. The Communist Party of Peru tried to take advantage of this riot and encouraged workers and soldiers to fraternise in the streets. Sergeant Huapaya did not have any plan or any specific objective to follow, his movement had no future and lacked political direction. Given this context, Huapaya managed to return to the Santa Catalina barracks and entrench himself in that fort.

The Santa Catalina barracks was besieged by loyal troops from the Artillery Regiment No. 2, the Chorrillos Military School and the "Republican Guard" Regiment, leading to a shootout. After a few moments, a parliamentarian left the barracks in search of dialogue with the government authorities. The Minister of War, Commander EP Gustavo Jiménez, the Minister of Government and Police, Francisco Tamayo and a group of officers responded to the proposal and entered the barracks, personally meeting with the rebel sergeant who was accompanied by 20 classes, who introduced them a list of demands from the mutineers. In said document the following claims were made:

1. Repeal of all resolutions and decrees that prevented the aspirations of sergeants to be officers.
2. Execution of former President Augusto B. Leguía and his main henchmen within 48 hours for having betrayed the Homeland.
3. Separation from service of all senior leaders of the army.
4. Construction of hygienic barracks.
5. Sales to the military with discounts for commercial houses and half-admission charge to those shows.
6. Payment of tips regularly.
7. Improvements in the ranch and in the treatment of soldiers.

Commander Jiménez rejected the list of demands. The fighting resumed and, as it continued, two planes dropped grenades in the courtyard of the barracks. At that, the rebels surrendered. Among dead and wounded there were more than 40 casualties in total.

== Aftermath ==
Sergeant Víctor Faustino Huapaya Chacón was sentenced to 20 years in prison by the War Council. However, the same Government Junta granted him an amnesty. After leaving prison, Huapaya declared himself a follower of Luis Miguel Sánchez Cerro and stated that his mutiny had been in favor of said leader.

In Villanueva's opinion "the Huapaya uprising demonstrated the insurrectional epidemic that the army was suffering."

The government believed that behind the mutiny were the actions of the Communist Party of Peru and alleged collaborators of the Sanchez Cerro regime. Apparently, a faction of communists had entered Lima to contact the CGTP and its party, due to Sánchez Cerro having called a contingent to use against the southern troops.

The National Government Junta, on the occasion of the Huapaya mutiny, declared on March 24, 1931, a state of siege in Lima and Callao.

== See also ==
- History of Peru (1919–1930)
- 1930 Peruvian coup d'état
