= José de la Riva-Agüero y Osma =

Peruvian historian, writer and politician (1885–1944)

José de la Riva-Agüero y Osma Marquis of Aulestia Marquis of Casa Dávila
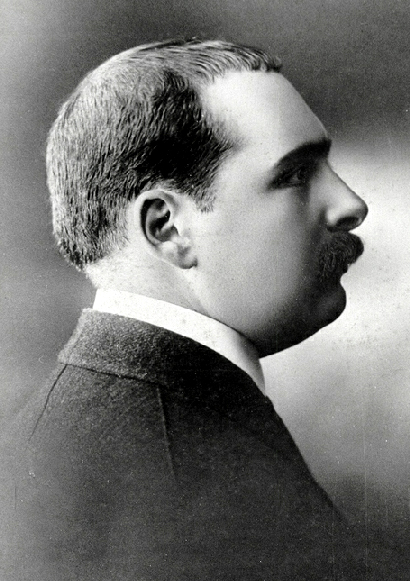

Prime Minister of Peru
- In office November 24, 1933 – May 18, 1934
- President: Oscar Benavides
- Preceded by: Jorge Prado Ugarteche
- Succeeded by: Alberto Rey de Castro

Personal details
- Born: February 26, 1885 Lima, Peru
- Died: October 25, 1944 (aged 59) Lima, Peru
- Party: Democratic National Party, Peruvian Fascist Brotherhood
- Education: University of San Marcos
- Occupation: Writer, historian and politician

José de la Riva-Agüero y Osma, 6th Marquess of Montealegre de Aulestia and 5th of Casa-Dávila (26 February 1885 – 25 October 1944) was a Peruvian lawyer, historian, writer, essayist and politician who served as Prime Minister of Peru, Minister of Justice and Mayor of Lima. He was a leading member of the so-called Generation of 900 (also known as the Arielist generation), a conservative ideological movement of the early 20th century that also included other important member of Peruvian society, such as Víctor Andrés Belaúnde, Francisco García Calderón Rey, Óscar Miró Quesada de la Guerra and José Gálvez Barrenechea.

He was a notable polygraph and his works included treatises on law, literary history, the history of Peru, legal philosophy and religious thought, many of which have had great impact and fundamental influence on the development of Peruvian culture. His thought followed a changing trajectory, evolving from a youthful liberalism to a severe conservatism rooted in Christianity. He did not marry or leave an inheritance, bequeathing most of his fortune (made up of agricultural estates and works of art) to the Pontifical Catholic University of Peru, thus becoming the main benefactor of the institution, which created the Riva-Agüero Institute three years after his death.

== Early years ==
Riva-Agüero was born in Lima, the only child of José Carlos de la Riva-Agüero y Riglos and María de los Dolores de Osma y Sancho-Dávila, 5th Marquise of Montealegre de Aulestia. He was a grandson of José de la Riva-Agüero y Looz and a patrilineal descendant of José de la Riva-Agüero y Sánchez-Boquete, first President of Peru, and the Princess Caroline-Arnoldine de Looz-Corswarem.

He was educated at Recoleta Sacred Heart School and the University of San Marcos, where he read philosophy, human sciences and law. While at San Marcos, he gained a reputation for academic excellence and political activism, and was part of the so-called Generation of 1900. He received a Bachelor of Arts degree and a Doctorate degree in human sciences in 1905 and 1910, respectively, and a Bachelor of Arts in law in 1911. Riva-Agüero wrote his dissertation on "History in Peru" (La Historia en el Perú), the earliest work of historiography to be written in Latin America. Eventually, he became a lecturer of history of Peru at San Marcos in 1910.

In 1911, he published an article defending the issuance of an amnesty law for the political prisoners involved in the 1909 coup d'état attempt against Augusto Leguía. Leguía's Minister of the Interior, Juan de Dios Salazar, ordered his arrest, which immediately provoked bitter university protests and demonstrations that resulted in violent political repression by the National Gendarmerie. This event was the first confrontation between university students and police forces in the history of Peru. A few days after his imprisonment, he was released due to political pressure and the Minister resigned from his office.

After a long journey through Spain, where he did research in several archives and gave lectures in Seville, Riva-Agüero co-founded the moderate Democratic National Party in 1915 and supported the presidential candidature of the Civilista José Pardo y Barreda in the April 1915 election.

Around this time, he started a letter-writing relationship with his cousin, historian and journalist Álvaro Alcalá-Galiano y Osma, whom he would have met in 1913.

Immediately after Leguía's 1919 coup against Pardo, he wrote a manifesto and went into voluntary exile in Europe. During his first years in exile Riva-Agüero lived in Madrid, then he moved to Paris and later to Rome, where spent the most part of the eleven years of the Leguía's Government. When his mother died in 1926, he succeeded her as Marquis of Montealegre de Aulestia and was legally adopted by her maternal aunt Rosa Julia, 4th Marquise of Casa-Dávila, who later inherited him the title and a large fortune. In exile, Riva-Agüero abandoned his moderate views and came into contact with the works of Catholic rightist authors such as Jacques Bainville and Charles Maurras and soon became a disciple of their ideas. Riva-Agüero would live in Europe until 1930.

Riva-Agüero was a member of the Sovereign Military Order of Malta.

== Political career ==
=== Public office ===
Riva-Agüero returned to Peru in August 1930 when a military coup led by Commander Luis Miguel Sánchez Cerro overthrew Leguía's regime. In June 1931, he was elected as Director of the Institute of History at University of San Marcos, but resigned after just one month due to differences with the student government. Although he initially refused to take up any seat in the 1931 Constituent Assembly or otherwise participate in Sánchez Cerro's interim junta, he supported the Commander's presidential candidature in the 1931 general election. In May that same year, he had been appointed Mayor of Lima by the Samanez Ocampo's provisional government. As Mayor, he especially patronized cultural activities, but also had to deal with the 1931 telephone strike.

After Sánchez Cerro's assassination in 1933, the Assembly proclaimed General Óscar R. Benavides President of the Republic. In November 1933, Benavides appointed Riva-Agüero Prime Minister and Minister of Justice. He appointed Commander A. Henriod to head the Ministry of Interior and advocated a policy of repression against the leftist APRA and the Communist Party.

His political beliefs changed during his life, evolving from liberalism at his youth to a staunch conservatism rooted in Christianity. In the Biographical Dictionary of the Extreme Right Since 1890, he was listed as one of the leading figures of the far right in Peru.

=== Fascism ===
After his spell as Prime Minister Riva-Agüero moved further to the right. He launched his own hard-line Catholic Acción Patriótica movement after the model of Action Française and before long he had changed the name of this group to the Peruvian Fascist Brotherhood. He personally declared his support for Italian fascism and Falangism although it has been argued that politically he was more of a very elitist Catholic rightist who also supported Hispanidad. In his obituary speech to his colleague of his generation José María de la Jara y Ureta, he said that the failure of his political group was due to supporting certain "generous abstractions", such as freedom and democracy. Initially Riva-Agüero gained a strong following for his new endeavour but before long his newfound extremism, combined with his increasingly odd personal behaviour, began to lose him his credibility. He became strongly anti-Semitic and soon took to praising Adolf Hitler, losing him some support. Meanwhile, he started insisting that followers called him the Marquis of Aulestia, a title that had been in the family but had long since fell into disuse and which had little currency in a republic such as Peru, and his generally arrogant demeanour cost him more support. His persona was further damaged when he even took to occasional bouts of public transvestism at functions. He and the Peruvian Fascist Brotherhood finally drifted into obscurity in 1942 when Peru officially became one of the Allies although he continued to write articles in defence of the Axis powers until his death.

== Works ==
- 1905 - Carácter de la literatura del Perú independiente (Character of the Literature in Independent Peru)
- 1909 - Polémica histórica: el señor González de la Rosa y las obras de Valera y Garcilaso (Historic controversy. González de la Rosa and the works of Valera and Garcilaso)
- 1909 - Garcilaso y el padre Varela (Garcilaso and Father Varela)
- 1910 - History in Peru (La historia en el Perú)
- 1911 - The Concept of Law (Concepto del Derecho)
- 1916 - Elogio del Inca Garcilaso de la Vega (Elegy for Inca Garciliso de la Vega)
- 1919 - Un cantor de Santa Rosa: el conde de la Granja (A Cantor to Santa Rosa: the Count de la Granja)
- 1921 - El Perú histórico y artístico (Historic and Artistic Peru)
- 1922 - Correspondencia de la Audiencia de Lima (1549-1564) Correspondece of the Audiencia de Lima (1549-1564)
- 1930 - Los franciscanos en el Perú y las misiones de Occopa (Franciscans in Peru and the missions in Occopa)
- 1932 - Añoranzas (Longing)
- 1932 - Goethe: homenaje de Lima en el primer centenario de su muerte (Goethe: A Tribute on the centenary of his death)
- 1932 - El problema diplomático del sur: relaciones con Bolivia y Chile (The Southern Diplomatic Affair. Relations with Bolivia and Chile)
- 1932 - Discurso del Colegio Recoleta (Speech at Recoleta School)
- 1935 - Discursos académicos (Academic Speeches)
- 1935 - El primer alcalde de Lima, Nicolás de Ribra el Viejo y su posteridad (The First Alcalde of Lima: Nicolás de Ribera el Viejo and his Legacy)
- 1936 - Nuevos datos sobre el padre Hojeda: La Cristiada, sus inspiraciones eucarísticas (New Facts about Father Hojeda. La Cristiada, her eucharistic inspirations)
- 1937 - Civilización peruana; época prehispánica (Peruvian civilization. Pre-Hispanic era)
- 1937 - Dos estudios sobre Italia contemporánea (Two Studies on Contemporary Italy)
- 1937 - Lope de Vega
- 1937 - Cuzco preincaico: los Ayllus de los incas (Pre-Inca Cusco. The Ayllus of the Incas)
- 1937 - Origen, desarrollo e influencia del fascismo (The Origins, Development and Influence of Fascism)
- 1937-1938 - Por la verdad, la tradición y la patria (For Truth, Tradition and Fatherland)
- 1938 - D'Anunzzio
- 1941 - Goldoni y su influencia en España (Goldoni in Spain)
- 1944 - Anthology (Antología)
- 1944 - Estudios sobre literatura francesa (Studies on French Literature)
- 1944 - El obispo Sarasola (Bishop Sarasola)
- 1954 - Descripción anónima del Perú y Lima a principios del siglo XVII (Anonymous work on Peru and Lima in the Early Eighteenth Century)
- 1954 - Diego Mexía de Fernangil: poeta sevillano del siglo XVI, avecindado en el Perú y la segunda parte de su "Parnaso antártico" (Diego Mexía de Fernangil. Sevilian Poet of the Sixteenth century, settled in Peru and the second part of his 'Antarctic Parnassus')
- 1955 - Paisajes peruanos (Peruvian Landscapes)
- 1960 - Afirmación del Perú (Consolitation of Peru)
- 1962 - Obras completas (Complete Works)
- 1963 - El deán Valdiivia y la Confederación Perú-Boliviana (Dean Valdivia and the Peru-Bolivia Confederation)

== See also ==
- Pontifical Catholic University of Peru

== Bibliography ==
- Rivera, Víctor Samuel (2009). "El Marqués de Montealegre de Aulestia: biografía española de un nacionalista peruano". Escritos (in Spanish). 17 (39). Medellín: Pontifical Bolivarian University: 410–449. doi:10.18566/escr. ISSN 0120-1263. Archived from the original on 7 August 2016.
- Sánchez, Luis Alberto (1975). La literatura peruana. Derrotero para una historia cultural del Perú, tomo IV. Cuarta edición y definitiva. Lima: P. L. Villanueva Editor.

Political offices
Preceded by Jorge Prado y Ugarteche	Prime Minister of Peru; 1933–1934	Succeeded by Alberto Rey de Castro y Romaña
