= Constitutional Renewal Party of Peru =

The Constitutional Renewal Party of Peru (Spanish: Partido Constitucional Renovador del Perú, PCRP) was a political party in Peru.

== History ==
The party was founded in 1931 by the merger of the Constitutional Party and the National Coalition. In the general elections that year, party founder Arturo Osores was the PCRP's presidential candidate, finishing last in a four-candidate field with 7% of the vote, while the National Coalition won three seats in the Constitutional Congress.

The party was part of the Conservative Coalition for the 1936 general elections.

The party was part of the Concentración Nacional alliance for the 1939 general elections, but also won one seat in its own right in the Chamber of Deputies.
