= Democratic National Party (Peru) =

Democratic National Party (in Spanish: Partido Nacional Democrático) was a political party in Peru. It was founded in 1915 by José de la Riva Agüero. In contrast to its founders later flirtations with fascism the PND was a moderate party near the centre of Peruvian politics.
