= 1931 Peruvian general election =

- 11 October 1931
- Presidential election
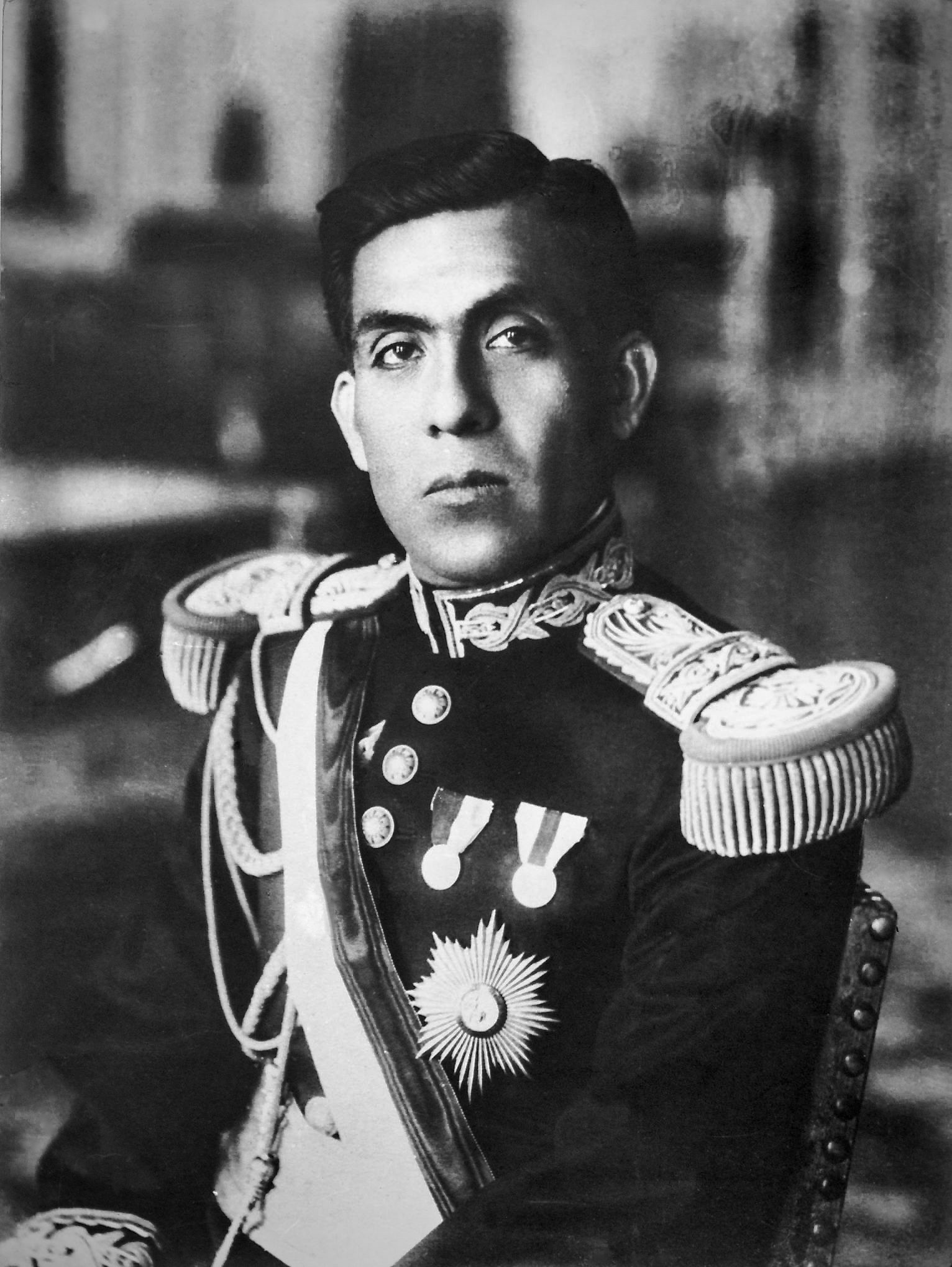

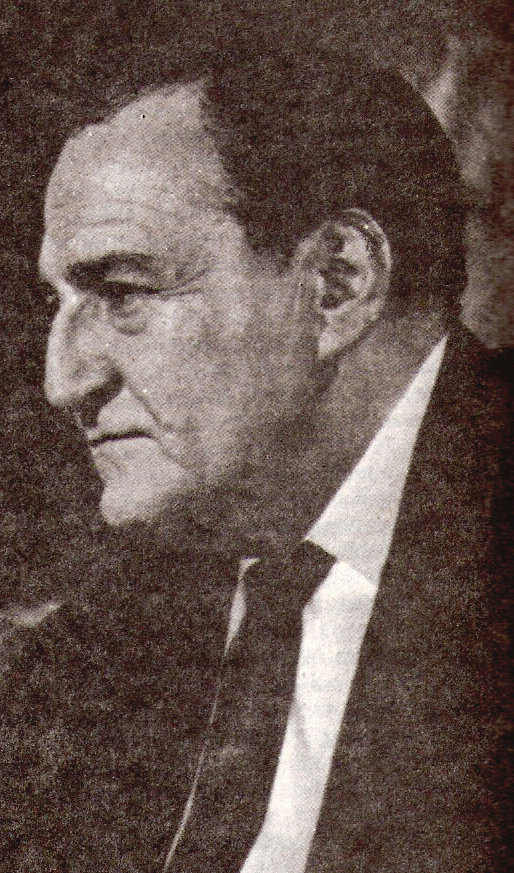

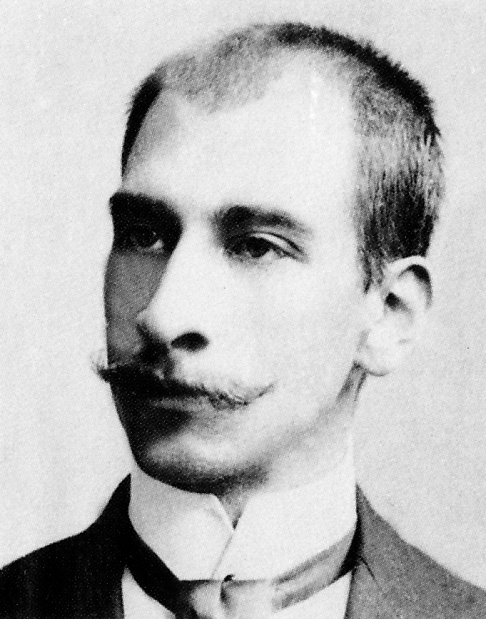
Nominee	Luis Miguel Sánchez Cerro	Víctor Raúl Haya de la Torre
Party	UR	APRA
Popular vote	152,149	106,088
Percentage	50.75%	35.38%
Nominee	José María de la Jara y Ureta	Arturo F. Osores Cabrera
Party	Decentralist Party	PCRP
Popular vote	21,950	19,640
Percentage	7.32%	6.55%
President before election
David Samanez Ocampo
Military junta
Elected President
Luis Miguel Sánchez Cerro
Revolutionary Union

General elections were held in Peru on 11 October 1931 to elect the President and a Constitutional Congress. The result was a victory for Luis Miguel Sánchez Cerro of the Revolutionary Union, who received 50.8% of the vote.

The election took place in the context of considerable political and economic instability. The 1930 Peruvian coup led to the overthrow of President Augusto B. Leguía and to an interim government headed by Luis Miguel Sánchez Cerro. On March 1, 1931, Sánchez resigned and went into exile. He returned on July 7, 1931, to be a candidate in the 1931 Peruvian general election. Haya de la Torre shortly thereafter also returned from exile to be a candidate in the election.

The election was primarily a context between two populist caudillos, Sánchez and Haya de la Torre.

Sanchez performed well in Piura in the far northern coast, in the South, and in the centre of the country, including Lima. Haya performed well in the mid-northern coast. Haya performed better among organized labour and white-collar groups while Sanchez performed well among small shopkeepers, artisans, unskilled urban workers and literate 'Indians' in the Sierra.

== Results ==
=== President ===
Sanchez Cerro was also supported by the Nationalist Social Party, Osores was supported by the Constitutional Party, the Labourist Party and the National Coalition Party, while Jara y Ureta was supported by the Decentralist Party and Popular Union.

Candidate	Party	Votes	%
Luis Miguel Sánchez Cerro	Revolutionary Union	152,149	50.75
Víctor Raúl Haya de la Torre	American Popular Revolutionary Alliance	106,088	35.38
José María de la Jara y Ureta	Decentralist Party	21,950	7.32
Arturo F. Osores Cabrera	Constitutional Renewal Party	19,640	6.55
Total		299,827	100.00
Valid votes		299,827	92.64
Invalid/blank votes		23,818	7.36
Total votes		323,645	100.00
Registered voters/turnout		392,363	82.49
Source: Nohlen

=== Constitutional Congress ===
Twelve elected members of the Congress later had their election declared invalid, including eight from the APRA, two independents and one each from the National Coalition and Revolutionary Union.

Party	Seats
Revolutionary Union	57
American Popular Revolutionary Alliance	36
Decentralist Party	28
Socialist Party of Peru	4
National Coalition	3
Nationalist Social Party	3
Popular Union	2
Unidentified	5
Independents	7
Total	145
Source: JNE
