= José Samanez =

Peruvian explorer

José Benigno Samanez y Ocampo (March 19, 1838 – November 14, 1887) navigated the rivers Apurimac, Ene, Tambo, Urubamba and Ucayali between 1883 and 1884, searching for the best way between the Pacific and Atlantic Ocean. Born in Andahuaylas in 1838, he was father of David Samanez Ocampo, president of the transitional government of Peru of 1931. He died in Iquitos in 1887 at the age of 49 of yellow fever while being the city prefect.
