= Popular Union (Peru) =

Popular Union (Spanish: Union Popular) was a political party in Peru. It was founded ahead of the 1931 Constituent Assembly election. The Popular Union was the first social-Christian party in the country, the precursor of the Christian Democrat Party.
