= Ricardo Leoncio Elías Arias =

President of Peru (1874–1951)

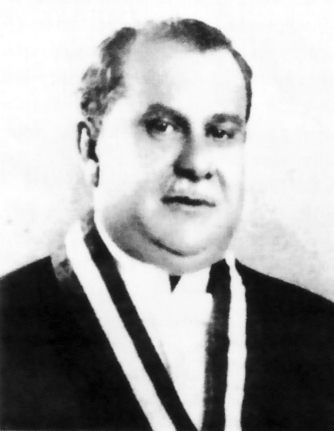
Ricardo Leoncio Elías Arias

Ricardo Leoncio Elías Arias (12 September 1874 in Pisco, Peru – 20 March 1951 in Lima, Peru) was a Peruvian soldier and politician who briefly served as the Interim President of Peru. officially as the President of the Provisional Government Junta, between March 1 and March 5, 1931.

He organized one of the various movements that caused the fall of president Augusto B. Leguía. After General Luis Miguel Sánchez Cerro was named provisional president, Elías was not satisfied and soon moved against him. In March 1931, Sánchez Cerro left the presidency to his vice president Olguín, who was soon deposed and Elías occupied the presidency. He himself, however, was deposed by Gustavo Jiménez only four days later. He remained in the new government as President of the Supreme Court until 1932.

Political offices
Preceded by Luis Miguel Sánchez Cerro	Interim President of Peru (President of the Provisional Government Junta); March 1, 1931 – March 5, 1931	Succeeded by Gustavo Jiménez
