= 1939 Peruvian constitutional referendum =

- 18 June 1939
- Outcome: Amendments declared unconstitutional by Congress

Results
Choice	Votes	%
Yes	368,813	87.82%
No	51,132	12.18%

A constitutional referendum was held in Peru on 18 June 1939. The proposed changes were approved by 88% of voters. Following the referendum, Manuel Prado Ugarteche was elected President on 4 December.

On 6 August 1945 the Congress passed a Law 10334, which declared the amendments unconstitutional, as they were not passed in line with Article 236 of the 1933 constitution.

== Background ==
In 1933 Congress elected Óscar R. Benavides to serve the remainder of President Luis Miguel Sánchez Cerro's five-year term in office. In the 1936 presidential elections no candidate received a majority of the vote. Due to this, and one candidate being supported by the banned American Popular Revolutionary Alliance, the Electoral Tribunal later declared the election invalid. Congress subsequently extended Benavides' term until 1939 and allowed him to rule by decree.

On 19 April 1939 he issued Law 8875 calling for a referendum on constitutional reform. The changes included setting six-year terms for both the Congress (although one third of members would be elected every two years) and the President.

== Results ==
Choice	Votes	%
For	368,813	87.83
Against	51,132	12.17
Invalid/blank votes		–
Total	419,945	100
Registered voters/turnout		
Source: Direct Democracy
