= Manuel Ponce Brousset =

President of Peru (1874–1966)

Manuel María Ponce Brousset
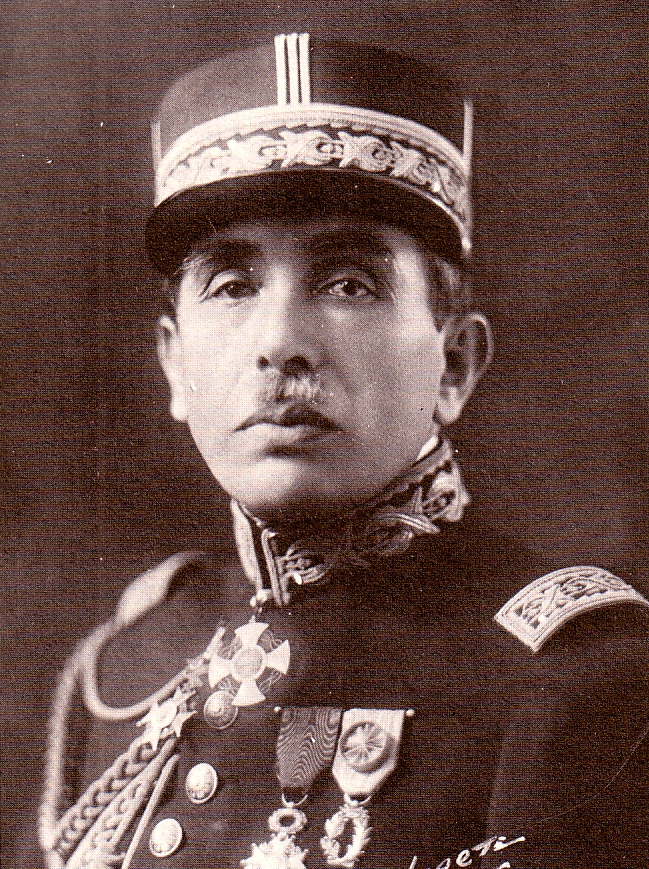

Interim President of Peru
- In office August 25, 1930 – August 27, 1930
- Prime Minister: Luis Miguel Sánchez Cerro
- Preceded by: Augusto B. Leguía
- Succeeded by: Luis Miguel Sánchez Cerro

Personal details
- Born: April 5, 1874 Arequipa, Peru
- Died: July 18, 1966 (aged 92) Lima, Peru
- Party: Revolutionary Union

Manuel María Ponce Brousset (April 5, 1874 in Arequipa, Peru – July 18, 1966 in Lima) briefly served as the President of Peru in August 1930.

After Luis Miguel Sánchez Cerro overthrew Augusto B. Leguía's eleven-year dictatorship through a coup d'état in Arequipa, Ponce assumed the two-day interim presidency until Sánchez Cerro arrived in Lima and was designated as Leguía's successor. Brousset died in July 18, 1966 at the age of 92.

Political offices
Preceded by Augusto B. Leguía y Salcedo	President of Peru; 1930	Succeeded by Luis Miguel Sánchez Cerro
