= 1939 Peruvian general election =

- 22 October 1939
- Presidential election
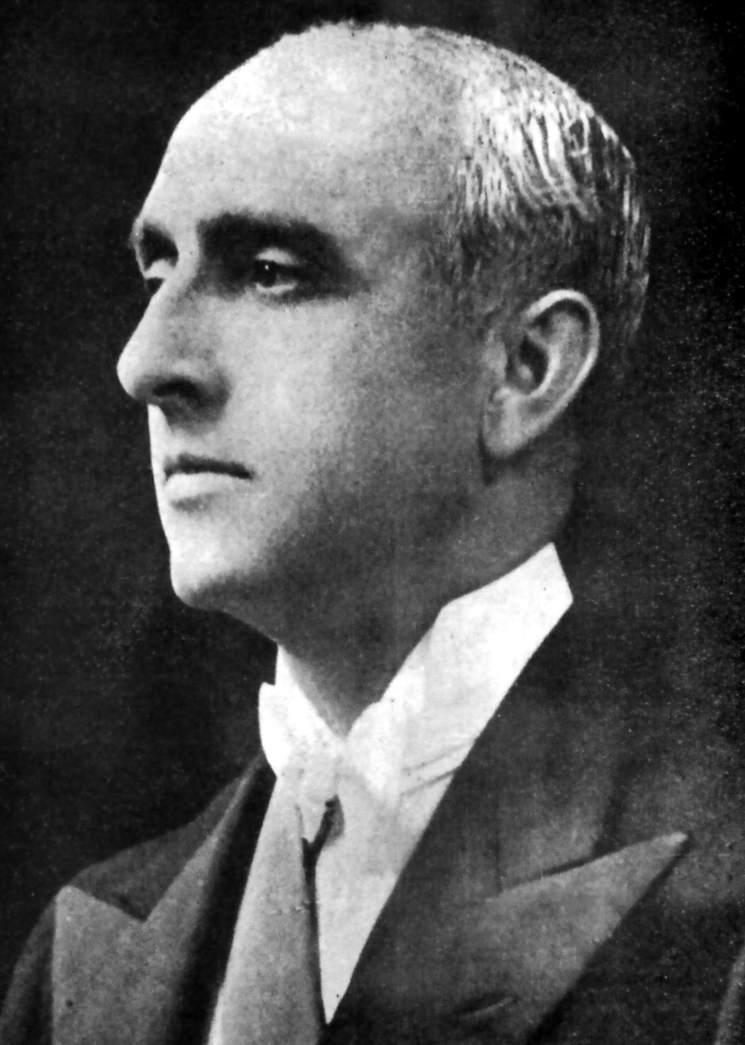

| Nominee | Manuel Prado Ugarteche | José Quesada Larrea |
| Party | Concentración Nacional | Patriotic Front |
| Popular vote | 262,971 | 76,222 |
| Percentage | 77.53% | 22.47% |
President before election
Óscar R. Benavides
Military junta
Elected President
Manuel Prado Ugarteche
Concentración Nacional

General elections were held in Peru on 22 October 1939 to elect the President and both houses of the Congress. In the presidential elections the result was a victory for Manuel Prado Ugarteche of the Concentración Nacional coalition, who received 77.5% of the vote. The Concentración Nacional also won a landslide victory in the Congressional elections, winning 45 of the 48 seats in the Senate and 111 of the 140 seats in the Chamber of Deputies.

== Results ==
=== President ===
| Candidate | Party | Votes | % |
|---|---|---|---|
| Manuel Prado Ugarteche | Concentración Nacional | 262,971 | 77.53 |
| José Quesada Larrea | Patriotic Front | 76,222 | 22.47 |
| Total | | 339,193 | 100.00 |
| Registered voters/turnout | | 597,182 | – |
Source: Nohlen

=== Senate ===
| Party | Seats |
|---|---|
| Concentración Nacional | 45 |
| Patriotic Front | 1 |
| Unidentified | 2 |
| Total | 48 |
Source: JNE

=== Chamber of Deputies ===
| Party | Seats |
|---|---|
| Concentración Nacional | 111 |
| Liberal Party | 5 |
| Constitutional Renewal Party | 1 |
| Patriotic Front | 1 |
| Revolutionary Union | 1 |
| Unidentified | 16 |
| Independents | 5 |
| Total | 140 |
Source: JNE
