= Gustavo Jiménez =

Interim President of Peru

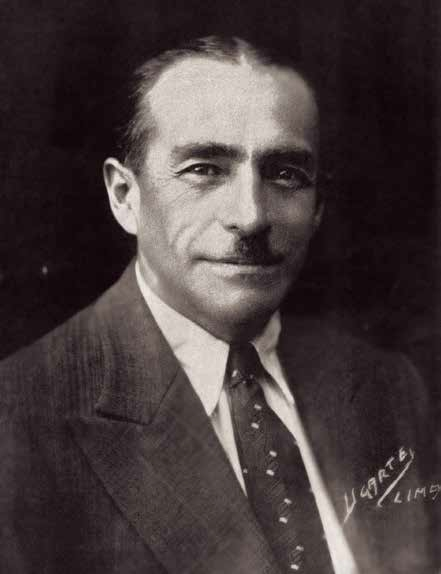

Interim President of Peru (President of the Provisional Government Junta)
- In office 5 March 1931 – 11 March 1931
- Preceded by: Ricardo Leoncio Elías Arias
- Succeeded by: David Samanez Ocampo

Personal details
- Born: 5 April 1886 Tarma, Peru
- Died: 15 March 1933 (aged 46) Lima, Peru

Gustavo Jiménez (5 April 1886 – 15 March 1933) was a Peruvian colonel who served as Interim President of Peru, officially as the President of the Provisional Government Junta, in 1931.

Jiménez, who was born in Tarma, organised one of several uprisings that led to the fall of the government of Augusto B. Leguía. After the nomination of General Luis Miguel Sánchez Cerro as the new provisional president, Jiménez kept his supporters under arms since he did not agree with the decision. Following the replacement of Sánchez Cerro with Ricardo Leoncio Elías Arias, Jiménez returned to Lima on 5 March 1931. After entering the presidential palace and a negotiation with Elías, Jiménez became the new president, even though David Samanez Ocampo had been expected to take over presidential power that day.

Due to the continuing unrest in the country and strong resistance against Jiménez from the Navy, Jiménez turned power over to David Samanez Ocampo on 11 March. He died in Lima.

Political offices
| Preceded by Ricardo Leoncio Elías Arias | Interim President of Peru (President of the Provisional Government Junta); March 5, 1931 – March 11, 1931 | Succeeded by David Samanez Ocampo |
