= 1930 Peruvian coup d'état =

1930 coup d'état in Peru

- Part of the second presidency of Augusto Leguía
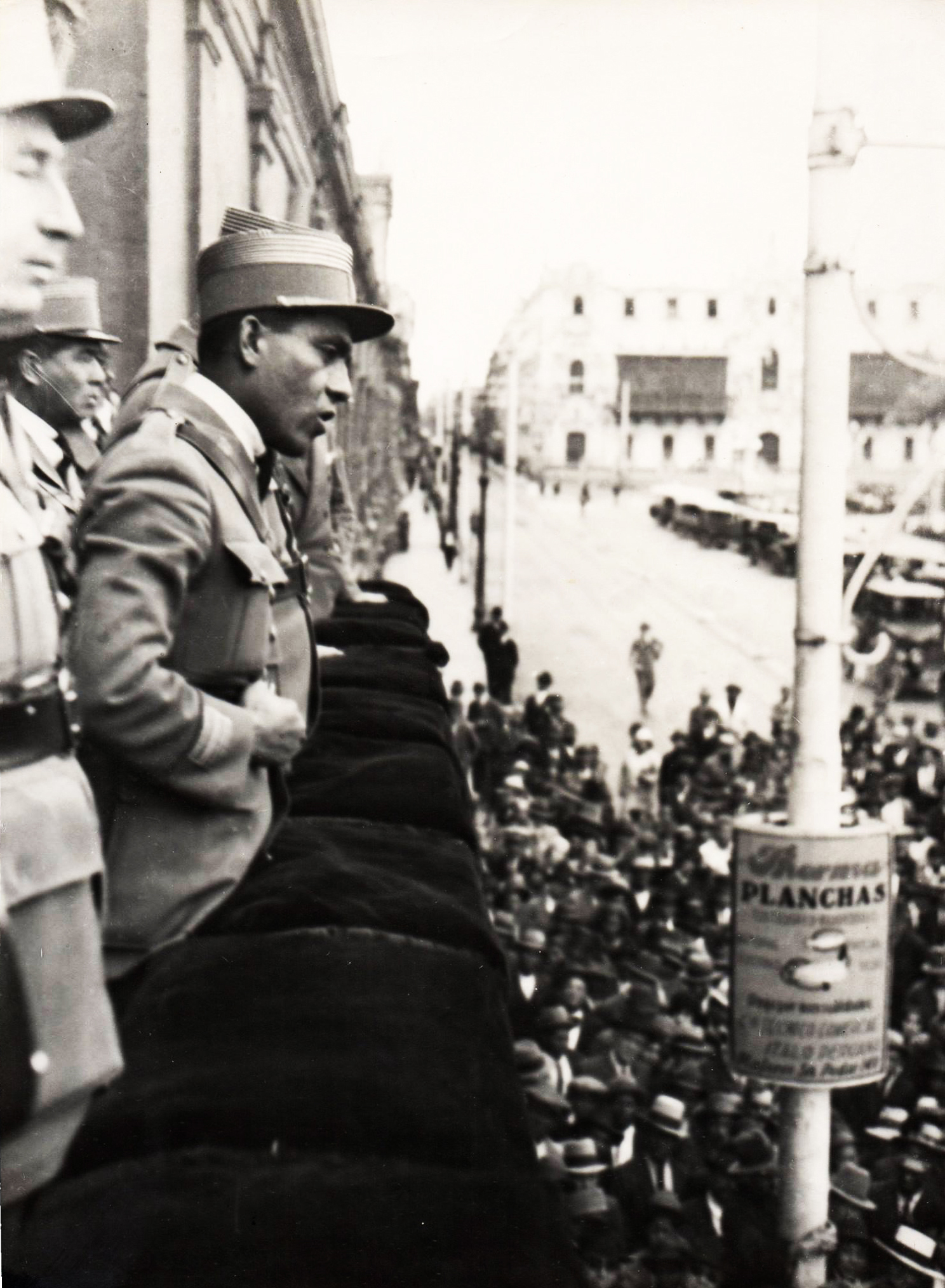
- Sánchez Cerro speaks in Lima on the 27th
Date	22–27 August 1930
Location	Arequipa and Lima, Peru
Result	Army victory: Overthrow of Augusto Bernandino Leguía; Luis Sánchez Cerro becomes president

Belligerents
Government of Peru	Peruvian Army

Commanders and leaders
Augusto B. Leguía (surrendered)	Luis Sánchez Cerro Manuel Ponce

The 1930 Peruvian coup d'état or Arequipa rebellion took place on August 22–27 of 1930, headed by commander Luis Miguel Sánchez Cerro in Arequipa, although with the support of Manuel María Ponce Brousset's force in Lima, against President Augusto B. Leguía.

Sánchez Cerro, who, through a manifesto to the nation, revolted the garrison of Arequipa against the government of Augusto B. Leguía. The military rebellion spread through southern Peru, extending to the country's capital, Lima, where the city's garrison joined the coup. The result of the coup was successful for Sánchez Cerro, who arrived in Lima on August 25 to take the reins of the country, while Leguía resigned from the Presidency and was imprisoned in the city's penitentiary.

== Background ==
Beginning in 1930, the second government of Augusto B. Leguía entered its eleventh consecutive year, struggling in a severe and accelerated economic crisis, an extension of the world economic crisis, due to the crash of 1929. The labour sectors, directly affected by the rise in the cost of living and the scarcity of subsistence and influenced by unionism and the Communist Party, were the first to raise their protest.

The crisis, however, was not only economic. The evident administrative corruption, from which close associates or friends of the president benefited throughout the regime, as well as the signing of the border treaties with Colombia (Salomón–Lozano Treaty) and Chile (Lima Treaty) with territorial transfer, further accentuated the opposition to the government. The army also showed its discontent. Subversive actions and plans to assassinate the president were rumoured.

== Coup ==
One of the conspirators was Lieutenant Colonel Luis Miguel Sánchez Cerro, who was in command of a garrison in Arequipa. Sánchez Cerro was already an acquaintance of Leguía's regime. In 1921 and 1922 he had participated in provincial uprisings, as a result of which he was imprisoned on the islands of Taquile and San Lorenzo, but he later reconciled with the government and was readmitted to the army.

Leguía, in his memoirs, says that in March 1930 he signed the promotion to commander of the then Major Sánchez Cerro, despite the distrust that he inspired in him, but stating that he did so on the recommendation of Foción Mariátegui (considered number 2 man of his regime). and General Manuel María Ponce Brousset. Leguía suspected that Mariátegui had conspired with Sánchez Cerro to perpetrate the coup d'état, but there has never been proof of this.

=== Arequipa ===
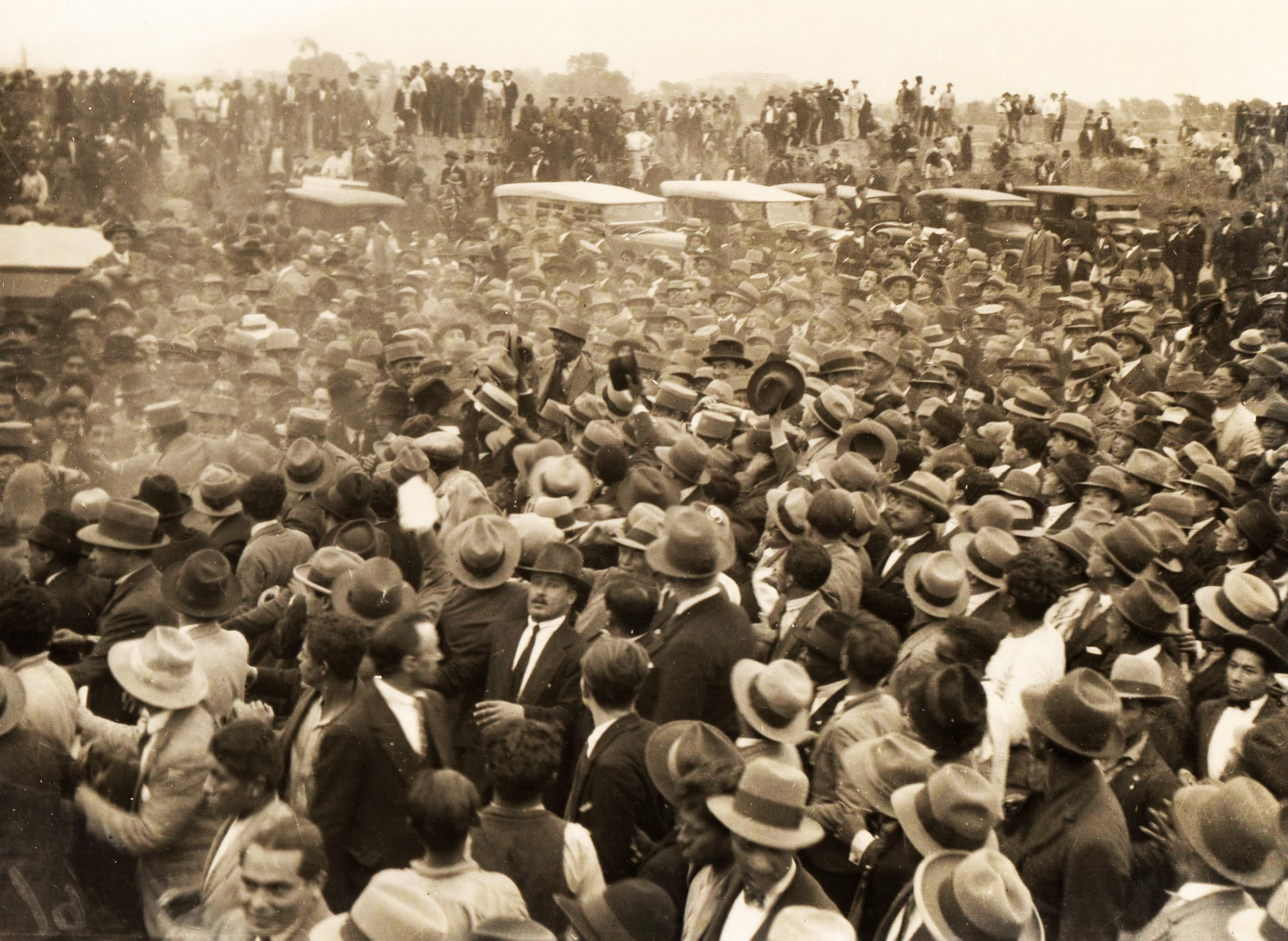
Sánchez Cerro with a crowd in Arequipa.

In the early morning hours of August 22, 1930, the troops stationed in Arequipa left their barracks to carry out routine exercises. Already in the countryside, between the cemetery and Socabaya, Commander Sánchez Cerro addressed them and urged them to rebel to put an end to Leguía's regime, one that was "a shame for the country." The troops jubilantly approved his words, beginning the revolution. At twelve in the morning, Sánchez Cerro, leading the soldiers, entered the city of Misti, whose population, recovered from his initial surprise, enthusiastically joined the movement.

That same day, Sánchez Cerro gave a decree signed alone, by which he titled himself "Commander in Chief of the Southern Army and Head of Government." Likewise, he proclaimed himself "Supreme Military and Political Chief", and from his "Government House" in Arequipa, he gave another decree appointing his secretaries, who were: Major Alejandro Barco (Military Affairs); José Luis Bustamante y Rivero (Political Affairs); Manuel A. Vinelli (Financial and Administrative Affairs); Major Rubén del Castillo (Postal Affairs and Transmissions); Major Julio Arboleda Viñas (Transportation and Communications) and Gustavo de la Jara (Comptroller General).

The political statement of the rebels was written by Bustamante and is known as the "Arequipa Manifesto", described by Jorge Basadre, as a "beautiful and lyrical document" that left an impression throughout the country.

The insurgent movement spread rapidly through the south of the country. On August 23, the fourth division stationed in Puno, which was the largest in the region, allied itself to the rebellion. Also in Lima the atmosphere was favourable for the revolution.

=== Lima ===
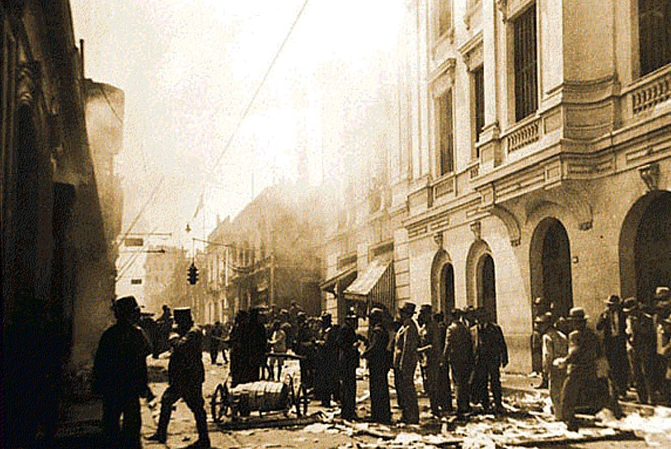
Leguía's house looted by supporters of the coup.

The news of the Arequipa uprising reached Lima on the night of August 22. The government ordered the closure of the port of Mollendo and the suspension of flights to the city of Arequipa. On Sunday the 24th, Leguía went to Santa Beatriz racetrack, as was his usual habit every weekend. On the street, he began to be heckled by locals.

Wanting to take some measure to confront the situation, Leguía decided to form a military cabinet, at the head of which he placed General Fernando Sarmiento. Said cabinet was sworn in at one in the morning on August 25. Leguía's intention was to resign the presidency before Congress and leave power in the hands of said cabinet.

But simultaneously, the heads of the Lima garrison had met to elect a Government Junta. Aware of the formation of the new military cabinet, they sent representatives to the Government Palace to request Leguía's immediate resignation as president. It was three in the morning on August 25. A tense dialogue ensued. Leguía finally accepted and renounced power, which remained in the hands of a Military Government Junta chaired by the Chief of Staff, General Manuel María Ponce Brousset. During his resignation speech, Leguía denied ever trying to turn Peru into a dictatorship that would enrich himself at the expense of the Peruvian people, while warning that those taking over the government "will see the bitter difficulties of government".

As a protective measure, Leguía was transferred to the cruise ship Almirante Grau, which headed to Panama. However, from Arequipa, Sánchez Cerro strongly urged the Lima Junta to turn back the ship. Through the use of the radio (then a novelty), the ship's captain was forced to turn around when he was about to leave Peruvian waters. Leguía was taken prisoner on board the ship and forced to disembark, being interned on the island of San Lorenzo.

The Sánchez Cerro uprising in Arequipa was one of several that were being planned throughout the country; It is known, for example, that in Lima there was one already scheduled for September. An armed expedition coming from abroad and made up of exiles from the dictatorship was also announced. Sánchez Cerro, known for his strong personality, was ahead of everyone, and the other insurgents ended up supporting him to assume leadership of the country.

=== Dispute ===
Sánchez Cerro at the head of a Junta in Arequipa, and Ponce at the head of another in Lima, was a duality that complicated the political situation. From a hierarchical and military point of view, General Ponce was responsible for command of the rebellion, and not Sánchez Cerro, who was only a commander. But the majority public opinion did not sympathise with the Lima Junta, which it considered an extension of Leguía's regime, and demanded that power be given to Sánchez Cerro, who was the most charismatic leader.

Contributing to Sánchez Cerro's popularity, in addition to his leadership skills and his reputation as a tough and energetic soldier, was his marked mestizo or "cholo" physiognomy, making the townspeople see him "as one of them."

The Ponce Junta even offered the War portfolio to Sánchez Cerro, but he rejected it. Through a telegraphic response, Sánchez Cerro said that he would not lend himself to the collusion of Creole politicians and that the only opinion he took into consideration was that of the people. In Lima, there were soldiers who supported Sánchez Cerro, whose center was the Chorrillos Military School. Las Palmas Aviation Centre and the Naval Academy also supported the leader of Arequipa.

== Aftermath ==
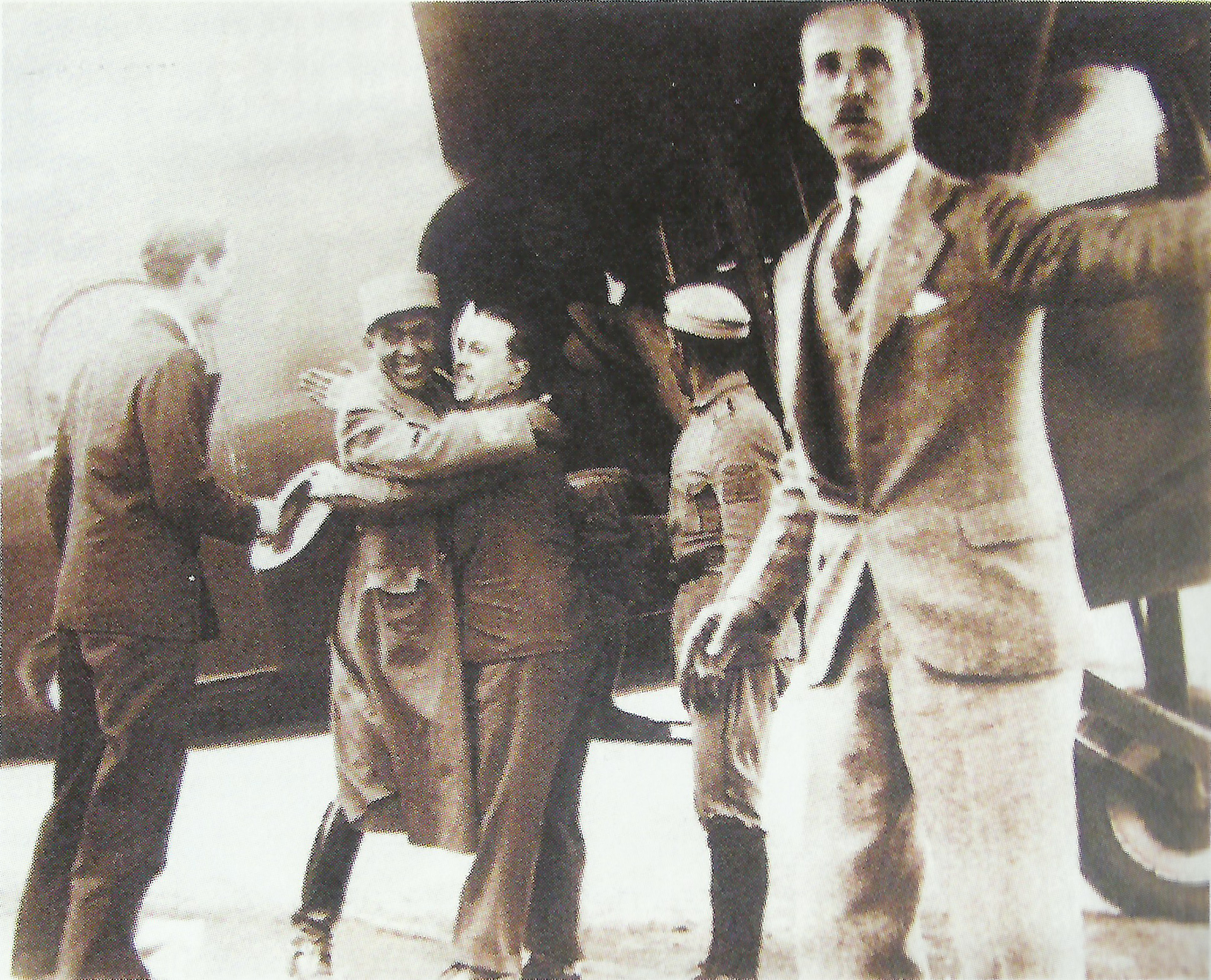
Sánchez Cerro arrives in Lima on the 25th.

Finally, on August 25, 1930, Sánchez Cerro took a plane from Arequipa and headed to Lima, where he was jubilantly received by his supporters. His arrival accelerated the end of the Ponce Junta. Large popular demonstrations took place in Lima celebrating the fall of Leguía and greeting the new leader.

On August 27, Sánchez Cerro installed the Military Government Junta in Lima, under his presidency: Through a statute issued in Decree Law No. 6874 of September 2, 1930, the Government Junta assumed the constitutional attributions of the Executive and Legislative powers and granted its head the category of president of the Republic and president of the Council of Ministers.

Among the urgent measures taken by the new government was the liquidation of Leguía's government, dismissing officials of the regime and the repression of those related to the ousted president, and repealed the unpopular laws of the dictatorship. Likewise, Augusto Leguía was transferred on September 16 to the Lima Penitentiary, where he would spend the rest of his days in a deplorable situation.

== See also ==
- Santa Catalina mutiny
- History of Peru (1930–1939)

== Bibliography ==
=== English sources ===
- Stein, Steve (1980). Populism in Peru: the emergence of the masses and the politics of social control (1. print ed.). Madison, Wis: University of Wisconsin Press. ISBN 978-0-299-07990-1.
- Ciccarelli, Orazio Andrea (1969). The Sanchez Cerro Regimes in Peru, 1930-1933. University of Florida.

=== Spanish sources ===
- Basadre, Jorge (1998). Historia de la República del Perú (1822–1933). Vol. 11 (8th ed.). Lima: La República, Universidad Ricardo Palma.
- Basadre, Jorge (2005a). Historia de la República del Perú. 7.º periodo: El Oncenio (1919-1930). Vol. 14 (9th ed.). Lima: Empresa Editora El Comercio S. A. ISBN 9972-205-76-2.
- Basadre, Jorge (2005b). Historia de la República del Perú. 8.º periodo: El comienzo de la irrupción de las masas organizadas en la política (1930-1933). Vol. 15 (9th ed.). Lima: Empresa Editora El Comercio S. A. ISBN 9972-205-77-0.
- Contreras, Carlos; Zuloaga, Marina (2019). Historia mínima del Perú (3rd ed.). Lima: Turner Publicaciones S.L. / El Colegio de México A.C. ISBN 978-84-16142-07-1.
- Chirinos, Enrique (1985). Historia de la República (1930-1985). Desde Sánchez Cerro hasta Alan García. Vol. 2 (3rd ed.). Lima, Perú: AFA Editores.
- Guerra, Margarita (1984). Historia General del Perú. La República Contemporánea (1919-1950). Vol. 12 (1st ed.). Lima, Perú: Editorial Milla Batres. ISBN 84-499-4818-5.
- Pons Muzzo, Gustavo (1980). Historia del Perú. La República (1868-1980). Lima: Librería, Distribuidora Bazar “San Miguel” E.I.R.L.
