= Decentralist Party =

Former political party in Peru

Decentralist Party (in Spanish: Partido Descentralista) was a political party in Peru. Its president was Francisco Tamayo.

The party's ideology centered around the involvement of citizen and civil society in the political sphere, to strengthen democracy. The party advocated for Decentralization of politics in Peru, in order to regain the citizens' trust in the democratic process after decades of centralized, authoritarian rule.

== Decentralist Party of the South ==
Decentralist Party of the South (in Spanish: Partido Descentralista del Sur or PDS) was a political party in Peru. It was founded in 1931 by Manuel J. Bustamante. It published Nuestra Tierra. The PDS was a merger of the Nationalist Agrarian Party and the Decentralist Party formed for the 1931 elections.
