= David Samanez Ocampo =

President of Peru (1865-1947)

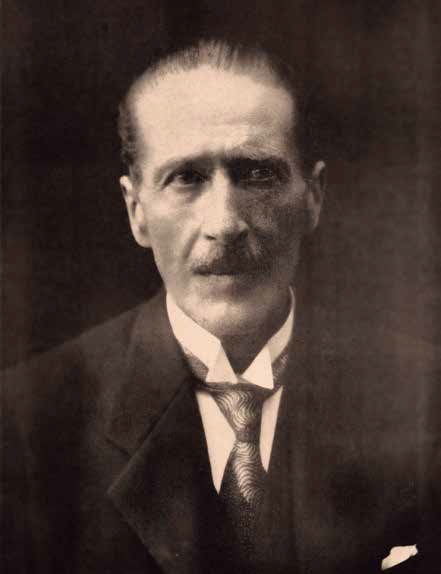

Interim President of Peru (President of the Southern Junta)
- In office March 11, 1931 – December 8, 1931
- Preceded by: Gustavo Jiménez
- Succeeded by: Luis Miguel Sánchez Cerro

Personal details
- Born: November 4, 1865 Andahuaylas, Peru
- Died: July 13, 1947 (aged 81) Cuzco, Peru

Military service
- Allegiance: Peru
- Battles/wars: Peruvian Civil War (1894–5)

David Samanez Ocampo (4 November 1865 – 13 July 1947), was a Peruvian politician who was Interim President of Peru (officially as the President of the Southern Junta) in 1931.

He oversaw changes to the electoral statutes that effectively brought the vote to the masses, leading to the critical – if highly controversial – presidential election of December 1931, where Sánchez Cerro defeated Victor Raúl Haya de la Torre. Instrumental in his appointment was his reputation and high prestige among politicians of all factions.

He was the son of José Samanez.

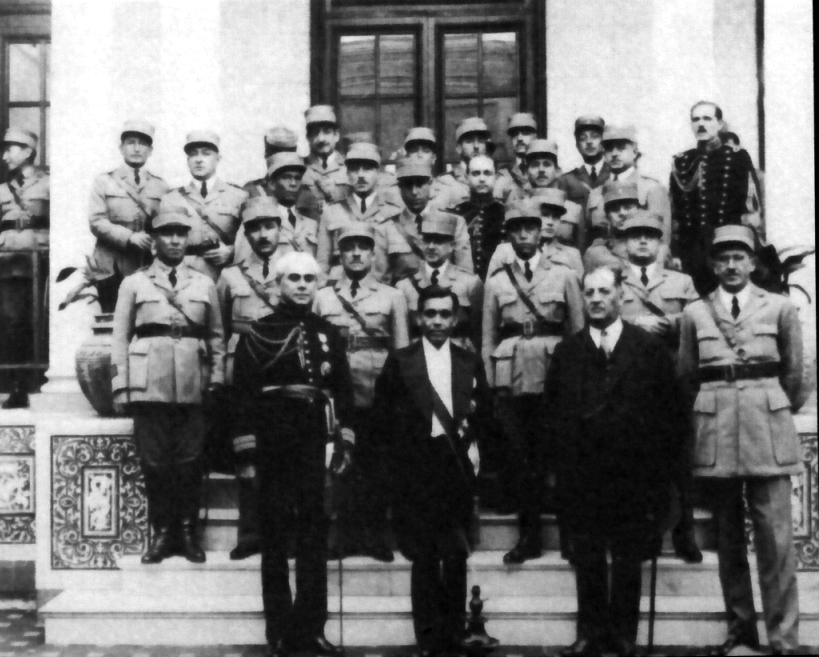
Luis Miguel Sánchez Cerro, after becoming Interim President of Peru (President of the Southern Junta).

== Democratic Party ==
Ocampo entered politics at an early age, joining the Democratic Party.

== Revival of Electoral Law ==
One of the widely appreciated achievement of Samanez-Ocampo's eight-month presidency was the revival of the electoral laws. This he did by drafting a special committee composed of the likes of, among others, Luis E. Valcárcel, Jorge Basadre Grohmann and Luis Alberto Sanchez. The committee established the secret ballot system and introduced provisions for the representation of minorities in the electoral system. The committee also introduced technological innovations to the electoral system, ridding it of the many redundancies.

Preceded by Gustavo Jiménez	Interim President of Peru (President of the Southern Junta); 1931	Succeeded by Luis Miguel Sánchez Cerro
