= Fascism in Peru =

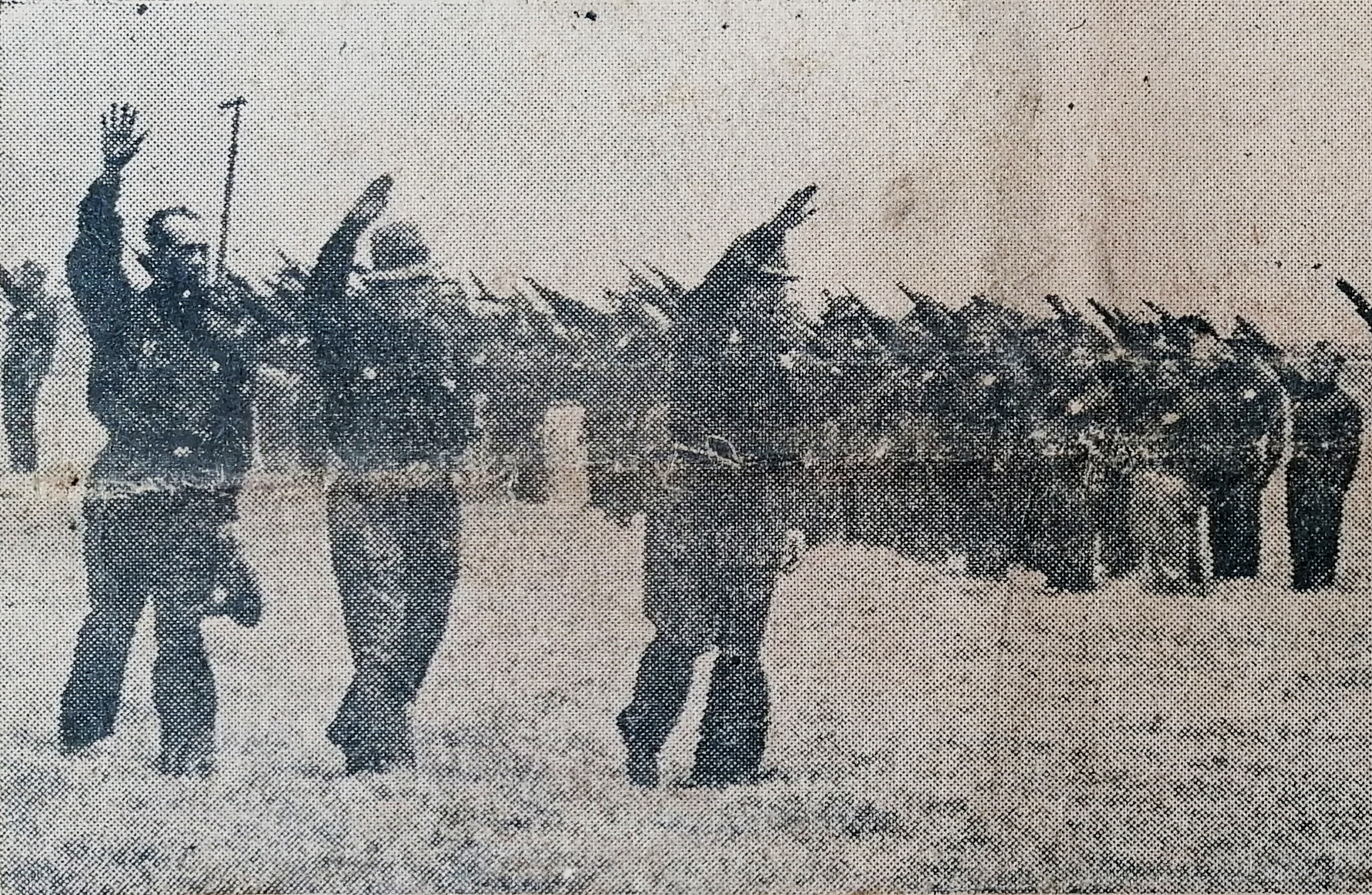
Luis A. Flores alongside Blackshirt militants portraying the Roman salute, 1934

Fascism as a political philosophy in Peru held great influence among different sectors of society during the early to mid-20th century. The movement was particularly strong following the Arequipa revolution of 1930 and the end of the Leguía's regime, although its popularity declined following the end of World War II, after the defeat and discredit of fascism worldwide. Peruvian fascism was mainly influenced by Italian fascism and, in a lesser way, Spanish falangism, while also drawing significant inspiration from Catholic tradition and the concept of Mestizaje, emphasizing the unity of the Peruvian people.

== Overview ==
According to historian José Ignacio López Soria, the fascist movement in Peru could be divided into three currents:

- Aristocratic fascism ("fascismo aristocrático"), which would be driven by a militant ultramontane Catholicism that fiercely opposed Marxist atheism and Protestant liberalism.
- Mesocratic fascism ("fascismo mesocrático"), popular among the middle classes, opposed the historic ruling class and sought to promote the needs of mestizos to build support among the diverse groups in Peru.
- Popular fascism ("fascismo popular"), incarnated in the Unión Revolucionaria (Revolutionary Union) and with a close relation towards the masses, seeking to support the notion of class collaboration.

According to historian Eduardo González Calleja, popular fascism would lack a Catholic background, being instead motivated by a strong opposition towards capitalism and the support of a corporate state that would control the capital, manage the economy and guarantee social discipline.

== History ==
=== Early foundations ===
The early 1930s saw an era of political polarization and a critical decade within Peruvian society, with a rise of strong mass movement in the political scene, including socialist and communist parties, including the APRA, led by Víctor Raúl Haya de la Torre. The Great Depression made Augusto B. Leguía’s 11-year length regime enter into crisis after losing much of its financial support, which was dependent on international loans. Major public works were halted, the cost of living increased, and unemployment ensued. Military institutions suffered from a lack of financial liquidity, reaching its peak with the failure to pay its troops. The regime lost its popularity and had a strong opposition of from distinct and heterogeneous groups, and the adoption of an indiscriminate reppressive policy against oppositors worsened the situation. The Leguía dictatorship, during its rule, displaced and prosecuted the civilistas from the government. By 1931, after the situation had become untenable, the military, suffering both materially and institutionally, exerted pressure over Leguía's regime, with some internal factions within the army wanted to displace him from the government.

==== Sanchezcerrismo and the Arequipa Revolution ====
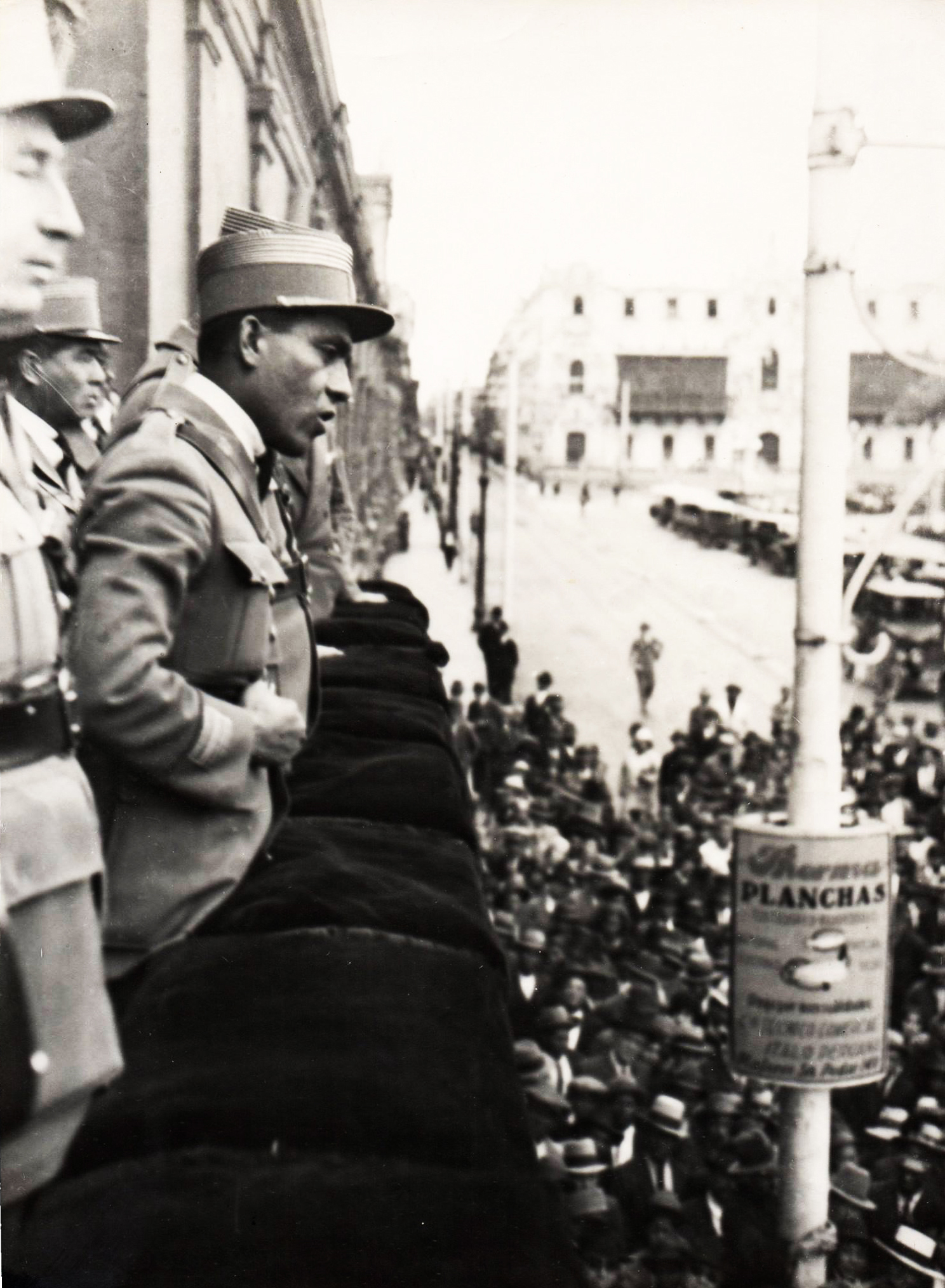
Luis Miguel Sánchez Cerro, founder of Revolutionary Union, speaking to supporters in Lima, 1930

Commander Luis M. Sánchez Cerro, an army officer and militarist who had witnessed the birth of the fascist movement in post-war Europe, led a coup d'état on 22 August 1930, known as the Arequipa Revolution. The rebellion, organized by Sanchez Cerro alongside military officers loyal to him, was highly successful, leading to a consequent uprising of the Lima garrison, who also demanded the resignation of Leguía as president. A group of commanders in Lima, with control of the local troops, expressed their support for their rebellious colleague in Arequipa and took power away from loyalist generals, forcing them to support Sanchez Cerro. The sublevation, with massive social support, ended the aristocratic government of Leguía and put Sánchez Cerro as the new president of Peru, establishing a right-wing junta characterized for its authoritarian and anti-communist posture.

During his regime, Sánchez Cerro promoted populist policies, such as distribution of provisions and food among the unemployed, and the confiscation of the assets of the most well-known leguiístas. The newly established regime saw support from distinct sectors of society, including former civilistas and conservatives. In less than three months after the revolution, the new regime established an alliance with said, and adopted strong measures against violent, communist-led strikes in order to restore peace.

Founded in 1931, the Unión Revolucionaria (UR) was established by Sánchez Cerro as the official party of the regime, and sought to channel the masses' desperation over the effects of the 1929 global crisis for the 1931 general elections. Although not a fascist himself, Sánchez Cerro had certain admiration for Benito Mussolini and the Fascist regime in Italy, whom he regarded as “so well organized”. His party, however, got certain inspiration with Mussolini's followers and adopted some symbols such as the classical blackshirt attire and some similar gestual postures. The organization was initially tolerable with liberal democracy, and had an heterogenic political composition among its members, including sanchezcerristas, anti-leguiistas, liberals, civilistas and indigenistas, but was still committed to a nationalist ideology.

==== Intellectual development of the movement ====
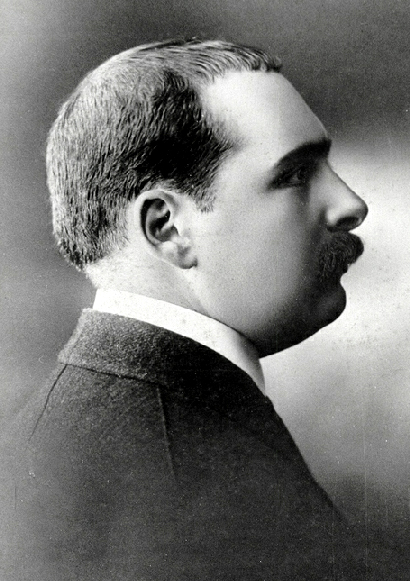
José de la Riva-Agüero, Peruvian conservative intellectual and founder of Acción Católica

The intellectual development of fascism in Peru emerged in the early 1930s, during the years of the Sánchez Cerro presidency. Early fascist thought in Peru was influenced by European fascism, but adapted to the Peruvian socio-political context. Influenced by global developments such as the Fascist experience in Italy or the Spanish Civil War, Peruvian intellectuals explored various fascist currents, including classical fascism and falangism. This era saw a reapparition of former adherents of the civilista movement, alongside a right-leaning, nationalist youth in the universities, with figures like Luis A. Flores, Ernesto Byrne, Carlos Sayan Alvarez, Guillermo Hoyos Osores and Alfredo Herrera. These nationalist activists got interested in politics since the student mobilization against Leguía in the 1920s, and had fought the political left during their university years. This newer generation of nationalists had an ideological view closer to fascism than former liberal ideology of the civilista movement, and were one of the main political forces that supported the presidential candidacy of Sánchez Cerro as the leader of Revolutionary Union (UR). However, intellectual support for fascism was not exclusive of the political right; certain left-leaning intellectuals such as the progressive Dora Mayer or the socialist Abelardo Solís were also supportive of a fascist project in Peru.

The Pontifical Catholic University of Peru, Catholic Action and other Catholic groups supported Ferrero Rebagliati's concept of mesocratic fascism. The movement was inspired by Italian fascism and Spanish falangism.

Another main outlet for fascism became the Peruvian Fascist Brotherhood, formed by ex-Prime Minister José de la Riva-Agüero y Osma. Riva-Agüero became more supportive of fascism after he returned to Catholicism in 1932, believing, according to López Soria, that Peru should "return to the medieval, Catholic, Hispanic tradition as embodied now by fascism" and he used the teachings of Bartolomé Herrera and Alejandro Deustua to support his ideology. The Fascist Brotherhood initially enjoyed some prestige but it receded into the background after Peru entered the Second World War on the side of the Allies. Moreover, the group's credibility was damaged by its leader becoming increasingly eccentric in his personal behaviour.

==== Fascist-inspired governments ====
The most popular fascist faction in Peru was Revolutionary Union (UR), which was initially founded by President Luis Miguel Sánchez Cerro in 1931 as the state party of his dictatorship. President Sánchez Cerro, who had humble origins, was highly charismatic, familiar with the populace's customs and was recognized as courageous after overthrowing President Augusto B. Leguía. UR quickly found support from former Civilista Party members and the traditional oligarchy families who wanted to protect themselves from other populist movements. After President Sánchez Cerro's assassination in 1933, the group came under the leadership of Luis A. Flores, who sought to mobilise mass support and even set up a Blackshirt movement in imitation of the Italian model. Óscar R. Benavides, who took office after the assassination, also led an authoritarian conservative regime from 1933 to 1939. During his government, Benavides built a strong relationship with Peru's business leaders.

The Alianza Popular Revolucionaria Americana (APRA) was inspired by Víctor Raúl Haya de la Torre's observations of fascist and communist parties during his time in Europe. During the 1930s APRA developed certain similarities with fascism, such as calling for a new national community and founding a small paramilitary wing, but then it very quickly changed course and emerged as a mainstream social democratic party.

In 1944, APRA formed the National Democratic Front political coalition beside the far-right Reformist Democratic Party and the fascist Revolutionary Union party, excluding the Peruvian Communist Party. The alliance led to the triumph of ultraconservative José Luis Bustamante y Rivero becoming president the same year. The overall defeat of Revolutionary Union in the 1944 elections shook confidence in the movement and it faded.

=== Post-WWII era ===
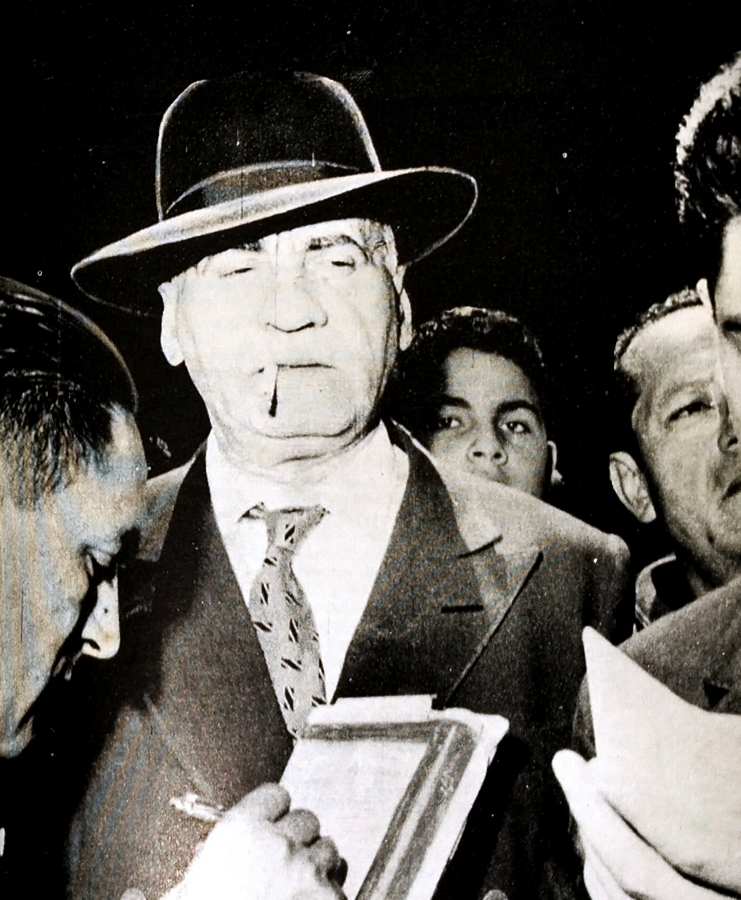
Luis A. Flores, former leader of the Revolutionary Union, during an interview in the 1960s

The end of World War II saw a discredition of fascism worldwide, both academically and politically, leading to its marginalization in Peru. Peruvian fascism lost most of its political presence, becoming more of an underground current rather than a mainstream ideology. Many intellectuals who had previously supported or sympathized with fascism during the 1930s and 1940s adapted to the new political landscape by accepting electoral mechanisms, and some of them went on to join right-wing or center-right parties while others participated as collaborators of dictatorships. Since Latin America did not suffer the horrors of war and there was not an open process of defascistization or denazification as it was in Germany, Revolutionary Union could continue their operations during the post-war years. However, the organization decayed politically and failed to regain the influence it had during the 1930s.

Luis A. Flores, former leader of the urrista movement, returned from his nine-year long exile in 1945 and resumed his fascist advocacy despite the end of the war. In 1946, Flores held briefly a senatorial seat representing the department of Piura until 1948, and in 1949, he was designated as the official ambassador to Italy, where he remained in charge until 1950. During this period, Flores initially supported Manuel A. Odría’s regime; however, over time, a rivalry developed between them that culminated in the political decline of the former. The urrista movement would last until the 1980s, disappearing entirely before the end of the Cold War, with remnants persisting up to the early days of the internal conflict in Peru.

The World Alliance of National-Revolutionaries (Spanish: Alianza Mundial de Nacional-Revolucionarios) was founded on 11 August 1975 aboard the yacht Feliciana in international waters off the coast of Peru, with Berhartd Gheyn (Chile), Aldo Rosado (Cuba), Tom Bleming, and A. Martín (South Africa) forming its leadership. The Alliance brought together delegates from distinct neo-fascist and national-revolutionary organizations from around the globe, including groups from Bolivia, Cuba, Argentina, Italy, Japan, Palestine, Chile, Germany, France, Portugal, and Spain. During the early 1980s, the minor National Socialist Movement of Peru (Spanish: Movimiento Nacional Socialista del Perú, MNSP) was founded in Lima. It was led by E. Basurto Carbonell and was supportive of "mainstream" national socialist policies. The MNSP maintained contact with other international neo-Nazi parties and, in 1981, was recognized as the Peruvian section of the World Union of National Socialists (WUNS). The White Power Movement (Spanish: Movimiento Poder Blanco, M-88), a minor fascist movement, was also active during the decade.

=== 21st century ===
In 2013, the short-lived Legionary Action (Spanish: Acción Legionaria) was established in Lima, marking the emergence of the first contemporary fascist organization in years. The group upheld the legacy of Sánchez Cerro and considered itself as the heirs of the former Revolutionary Union, proclaiming a Third Positionist ideology radically opposed towards both liberalism and communism. Such as its claimed predecessor, Acción Legionaria also adopted the classical blackshirt attire and the usage of fascist symbology. It also had close ties with the Brazilian neo-fascist organization Frente Nacionalista (National Front). During its period of activities, Legionary Action attempted to become a fascist political party, but would be eventually dissolved in 2016.

==== La Resistencia ====
The organization La Resistencia was founded in 2018 as a platform to support Keiko Fujimori, the daughter of Alberto Fujimori and leader of Popular Force. Popular Force member of Congress, Rosa Bartra, said she was a member of the group in 2019. It has been described as having neo-fascist traits. Members of La Resistencia have been observed using the roman salute and using hate speech.

Splinter groups of Las Resistencia have expressed certain sympathies with fascism, including Los Insurgentes and Los Combatientes del Pueblo. During the COVID-19 crisis, both groups engaged in spreading information and coordinating protests and grassroots mobilization in opposition to the lockdowns, mask usage and the mandatory vaccination policies, which they viewed as steps towards the establishment of a New World Order (NWO). Some members of said organizations have been closely associated with National Socialist sympathizers. Prior to the 2026 Peruvian general election, the attorney for Popular Force announced that Fujimori and her party have distanced themselves from La Resistencia, though acknowledged that the group has engaged in "freedom of expression."

== List of organizations ==
This list includes all types of national-revolutionary organizations active in Peru, including fascist, National Socialist and Falangist groups and parties, or associations with similar ideologies.

Name	Abbr.	Active		Ideology	Notes
Name	Abbr.	Start	End	Ideology	Notes
Unión Revolucionaria	UR	1931	1980s	Fascism	Turned to fascism after the assassination of Sánchez Cerro in 1933.
Sección Femenina	-	1932	?	Fascism	Women's wing of Unión Revolucionaria.
Legión de Camisas Negras	-	1933	1934	Fascism	Paramilitary wing of Unión Revolucionaria, inspired in the Italian Blackshirts.
Organización Juvenil de la UR	-	1934	?	Fascism	Youth wing of Unión Revolucionaria.
Falange de Arequipa	-	1938	1940s	Falangism	Branch of the Falange Exterior in Arequipa, with José R. Cardenal serving as local delegate.
Falange de Chiclayo	-	1938	1940s	Falangism	Branch of the Falange Exterior in Chiclayo, with José Barberoc serving as local delegate.
Falange de Sullana	-	1938	1940s	Falangism	Branch of the Falange Exterior in Sullana, with Francisco González Aguirregaviria serving as local delegate.
Falange de Cuzco	-	1939	1940s	Falangism	Branch of the Falange Exterior in Cuzco.
Falange de Trujillo	-	1939	1940s	Falangism	Branch of the Falange Exterior in Trujillo.
Legión Peruana	-	1939	?	Fascism	Short-lived movement, with a corporatist program written by Miguel Merino Schröder.
Escalones Juveniles Nacionalistas	EJN	1967	1971	Falangism	Student group founded in San Isidro, Lima, by Luis Fernando Figari; later linked to Sodalitium Christianae Vitae.
Movimiento Nacional Socialista del Perú	MNSP	1981	?	National Socialism	Led by E. Basurto Carbonell, the group was recognized as the Peruvian section of the WUNS in 1981.
Movimiento Poder Blanco	M-88	1980s	?	Fascism	Minor group active in the 1980s.
Falange Peru	-	2005	2012	Falangism	Minor group modelled after the Falange Española.
Acción Legionaria	AL	2013	2016	Fascism	Youth movement that claimed the legacy of Unión Revolucionaria, sought to become a political party.

== See also ==
- Conservatism in Peru
- Liberalism in Peru
- Communism in Peru
- Anarchism in Peru
- Ethnocacerism

== Sources ==
- Caldeira Neto, Odilon (2016). "Frente nacionalista, neofascismo e novas "direitas" no Brasil" [National Front, Neofascism and the "New Right" in Brazil]. Faces de Clio. 2 (4): 20–36.
- Castillo-García, César (2022). The crooked timber that bore fruit: Peruvian fascist intellectuals of the 1930s and the echoes of their influence nowadays. The New School for Social Research.
- Chanamé, Raúl (2021). La República Inconclusa (5 ed.). Lima: Fondo Editorial Cultura Peruana. ISBN 978-612-4182-35-8.
- Chirinos Soto, Enrique (1984). La Nueva constitución y los partidos. Lima: Centro Documentación Andina. ISBN 842490771X.
- Coronel, Omar (2024). "La nueva derecha radical de base en el Perú". Desafíos. 36 (2): 1–36. doi:10.12804/revistas.urosario.edu.co/desafios/a.13841.
- Gayozzo, Piero (2024). "Fascism in Peru: From Revolutionary Union to Legionary Action and Ethnocacerism". Fascism. 13 (2): 236–264. doi:10.1163/22116257-bja10080.
- Gonzales Alvarado, Osmar (2020). "José de la Riva Agüero y Felipe Sassone:dos pensadores sociales y el fascismo en el Perú" [José de la Riva Agüero and Felipe Sassone: Two social thinkers and Fascism in Peru]. Discursos del Sur, revista de teoría crítica en Ciencias Sociales (6): 75–96. doi:10.15381/dds.v0i6.19324. ISSN 2617-2283.
- González Calleja, Eduardo (1994). "La derecha latinoamericana en busca de un modelo fascista: la limitada influencia del falangismo en el Perú (1936-1945)" (PDF). Revista Complutense de Historia de América. 20. Madrid: Editorial Complutense.
- Haya de la Torre, Agustín (2005). "La difícil construcción de la comunidad política" (PDF). Investigaciones Sociales. 15. Lima: National University of San Marcos: 201–233.
- Lira, Israel (2017). "Breve Aproximación a los Fundamentos del Crisolismo" [Brief Approach to Fundamentals of Crisolism]. Revista de Estudios Crisolistas. 1 (1): 3–35.
- López Soria, José Ignacio (2022) [1981]. El pensamiento fascista en el Perú. Una antología [1930-1945] (2 ed.). Lima: Editorial Ande. ISBN 978-612-48818-3-1.
- Milà, Ernesto (1978). "Las "Internacionales Negras"". La Ofensiva Neo-Fascista. Barcelona: Acervo, D.L. ISBN 84-7002-245-8.
- Molinari, Tirso (2004). La Unión Revolucionaria, 1931-1939 : una aproximación a la historia del fascismo en el Perú (Master's thesis). Lima: Pontifical Catholic University of Peru.
- ——— (2006). "El Partido Unión Revolucionaria y su proyecto totalitario-fascista. Perú 1933-1936" (PDF). Investigaciones Sociales (16): 321–346.
- Nugent, David (November 2010). "States, secrecy, subversives: APRA and political fantasy in mid-20th-century Peru". American Ethnologist. 37 (4): 681–702. doi:10.1111/j.1548-1425.2010.01278.x.
- Ó Maoláin, Ciarán (1987). "Peru". The Radical right: a world directory. Harlow, GB Santa Barbara, Calif: Longman ABC-Clio. ISBN 0-582-90270-3.
- Peña, Milagros (1992). "The Sodalitium Vitae Movement in Peru: A Rewriting of Liberation Theology". Sociological Analysis. 53 (2): 159–173. doi:10.2307/3711121.
- Stein, Steve (1981). "Populism in Peru: The Emergence of the Masses and the Politics of Social Control". Hispanic American Historical Review. 61 (3): 553–554. doi:10.1215/00182168-61.3.553.
- Suárez Trejo, Javier (2018). "From Romana Gens to cumbiatella: propaganda, migration and identity in Italo-Peruvian mobilities". Modern Italy. 24 (1). Cambridge: Harvard University: 21–44. doi:10.1017/mit.2018.28.
- Trujillo, Said Ilich; Rosas, Carlos Andrés (2024). "Viejos discursos, nuevos recursos: los memes como herramienta de difusion de narrativas extremistas y de ultraderecha en el Peru" [Old Speeches, New Resources. Memes as a Tool for the Spread of Extremist Narratives and Far-Right Ideology in Peru]. Letras. 95 (141): 325–344. doi:10.30920/letras.95.141.19.
- Todorović, Tomislav (2013). "Peru Phalanx (Peru)". CRW Flags. Flags of the World.
- Vargas Murillo, Alfonso (2017). "Los Orígenes del Sanchezcerrismo en Tacna (1931-1934)" [Sanchezcerrismo's Origins in Tacna (1931 - 1934)]. La Vida & la Historia. 4 (6): 54–65.
- Young, Ron (2006). "Peru". In Blamires, Cyprian P. (ed.). World fascism: a historical encyclopedia. California: ABC-CLIO, Inc. ISBN 1-57607-940-6.
