= Casa Tenaud =

Former building in Peru

Palacete Tenaud
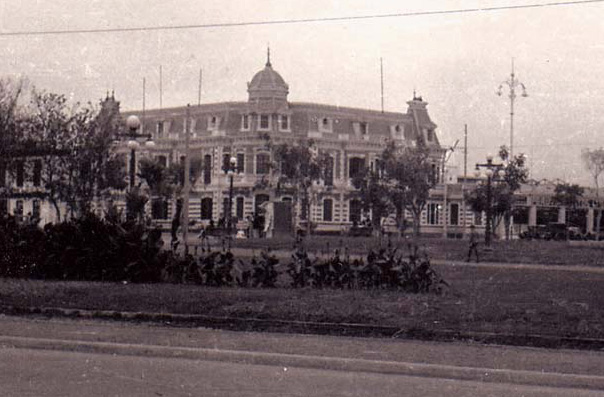
- Interactive map of the Palacete Tenaud area

General information
- Architectural style: Second Empire
- Coordinates: 12.0594°S 77.0352°W
- Completed: Early 20th century
- Closed: December 7, 1945
- Demolished: c. 1948

Design and construction
- Architect: Claude Sahut

The Casa Tenaud, also known as the Palacio Tenaud or as the Palacete Tenaud, was a building located at the intersection of today's Grau Avenue and the Paseo de la República, in Lima, Peru. The building was burned down on December 7, 1945, due to it being the location of the offices of the Revolutionary Union political party, including that of its leader, Luis A. Flores.

== History ==
The early 20th century building, named after its owner family, served diplomatic functions, such as hosting the Legation of France and receiving a visit of an Uruguayan delegation in 1918, headed by then Foreign Minister Baltasar Brum.

It later hosted law firms and part of it served as the headquarters of the Revolutionary Union, a fascist political party headed by Luis A. Flores, who also had his office in the building. Because of the party's ideology, it was a fierce opponent of the American Popular Revolutionary Alliance (APRA), a left-leaning party.

On the night of December 7, 1945, at approximately 11 p.m., the building was attacked by a pro-APRA crowd with firearms and dynamite. A gunfire ensued between the two groups and the building was ultimately consumed by a fire. The blame for the latter was disputed between both groups, with the fascists claiming that the crowd outside the palace interrupted any efforts made by local firemen, and the apristas claiming that the crowds had, in fact, assisted them. Two men were arrested after the events, Víctor H. Rivadeneira and Leonardo Sánchez, who were at the building and whose arrest warrants were highlighted by the apristas, and were thus blamed for the gunfight that hit APRA militants Justo Espinoza and Arturo Franco, and subsequent fire.

The building was eventually demolished and replaced on the same site by the Anglo–Peruvian building, the work of Ricardo Jaxa-Malachowski Benavides, son of Ricardo de Jaxa Malachowski. The new building was itself the location of another fire caused by a short-circuit on January 16, 1970, that affected the National billboard located on the rooftop. Another fire took place in 2012 and in 2016.

== See also ==
- Casa Marcionelli
