= Feliciana Coronel =

Paraguayan lesbian rights activist (1964–1996)

- Born: 24 January 1964; Asunción, Paraguay
- Died: 4 July 1996 (aged 32); Penitenciaria Nacional de Mujeres "Casa del Buen Pastor", Asunción, Paraguay
- Cause of death: murder by stabbing
- Occupation: lesbian rights activist

Feliciana Coronel (24 January 1964 – 4 July 1996), also known as "Chana", was a Paraguayan lesbian rights activist.

== Biography ==
Coronel was born in Asunción. She lived in the La Chacarita neighbourhood.

In 1991, Coronel was sentenced to 13 years in prison for possessing a kilo and a half of cocaine. In the Penitenciaria Nacional de Mujeres, known as "Casa del Buen Pastor," lesbians and heterosexual women without husbands or stable partners were prohibited from intimate visits. Lesbians were also not permitted much time to speak to each other.

Coronel led her fellow inmates to report the discrimination to which lesbians in prison were exposed to the press and the Supreme Court of Justice of Paraguay. On 17 September 1993, the El Diario newspaper published an article titled "Lesbians Demand Access to Private Services in the Women's Prison."

Coronel was stabbed to death in prison on 4 July 1996. No information about the circumstances of her death has been confirmed since she was killed, although newspapers at the time claimed that she was murdered by a lover.

== Legacy ==
Coronel is considered an icon in Paraguay of the fight for lesbian rights. Lesbian rights group Aireana continued to campaign for the rights that Coronel demanded until Resolution No. 72/12 of the General Directorate of Penitentiary Establishments and Penal Enforcement repealed the previous resolution that specified that visits must be from members of the "opposite sex."

Lesbian Visibility Day in Paraguay is held on 17 September in honour of the article published in El Diario.
