= Asunción Pride =

LGBTQ event in Paraguay

Paraguayan LGBT Pride March
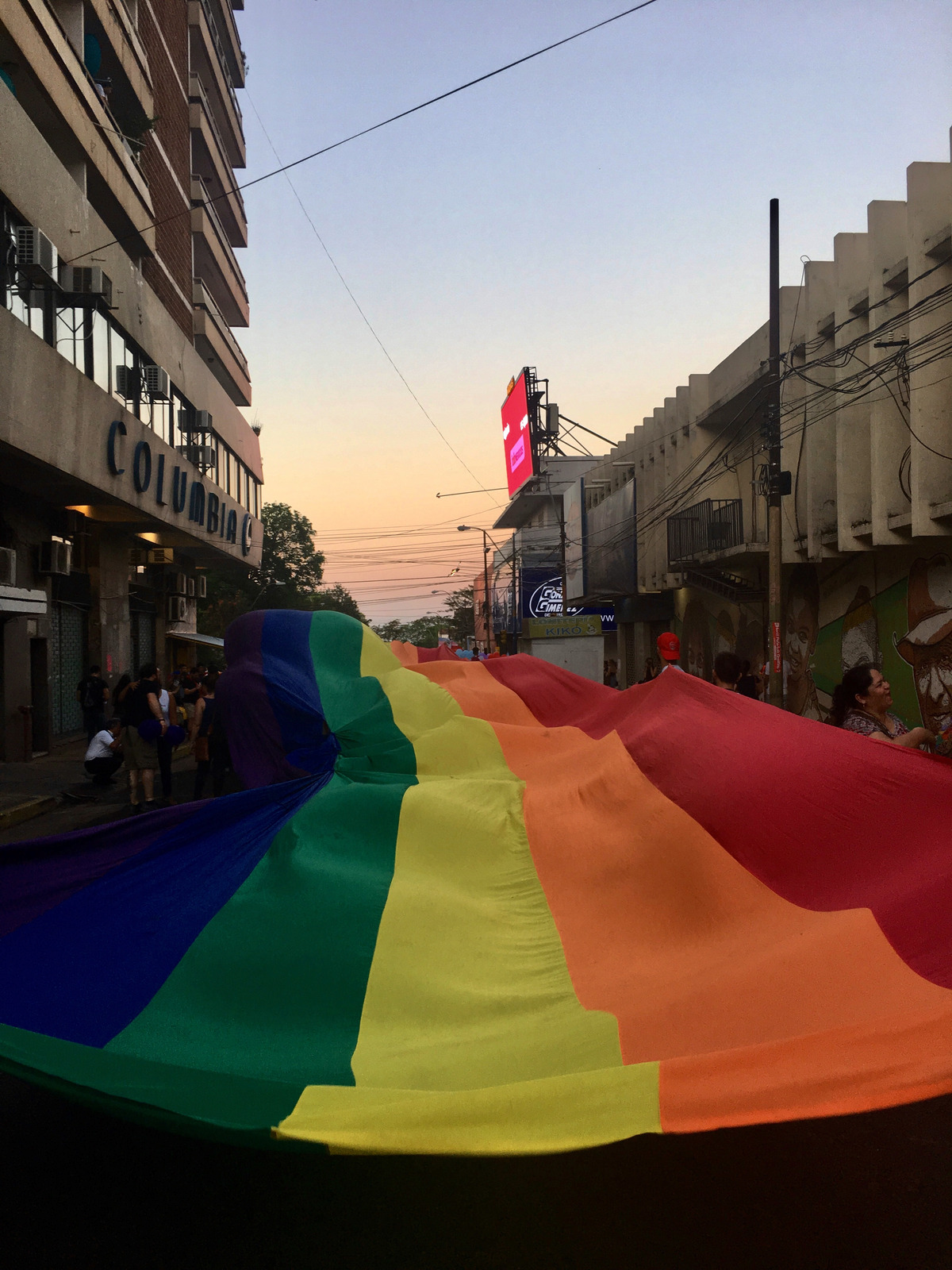
- March 2018
- Genre: Pride march
- Frequency: Annually every September 30
- Location: Asunción
- Country: Paraguay
- Inaugurated: September 30, 2004
- Organiser: Gay, Lesbian and Transgender Action Group (GAGLT)

The Asunción LGBT Pride March, also known as the March for TLGBI+ Rights, is an annual demonstration held in the capital of Paraguay. The march seeks equality and aims to make visible the struggles of transgender, lesbian, gay, bisexual, intersex, non-binary individuals, and all people who challenge traditional norms of gender and sexuality.

It takes place every year on September 30, commemorating the first known act of LGBT resistance in Paraguay: the publication of The Letter from an Amoral Man, a protest letter published on September 30, 1959. It was written in response to a brutal crackdown—known as Case 108—launched by the military dictatorship of Alfredo Stroessner, which targeted individuals labeled as "amoral" following the murder of radio host Bernardo Aranda.

== History ==
The first edition was held in 2004, organized by the Gay, Lesbian and Transgender Action Group (GAGLT) as part of the Week for the Rights of Gays, Lesbians, and Transgender People, under the slogan "For a Paraguayan society without discrimination." As the closing event of the commemorative week, the "March Against Discrimination" took place on July 3, 2004, in the downtown area of the capital. The documentary 108, cuchillo de palo by Renate Costa includes footage of this first march in 2004.

In the early years, the march was held on June 28, in commemoration of International LGBT Pride Day. Since 2010, it has taken place every year on September 30. This decision was made by consensus among several organizations that form the TLGBI coalition, with the aim of reclaiming Paraguay's collective memory and honoring what is considered the first public demand for LGBT rights in the country—the publication, on September 30, 1959, of The Letter from an Amoral Man.

== Background ==
On December 10, 1998, during the commemoration of Human Rights Day in Asunción, around 20 people—including members of the trans organization "Lazos" and lesbian activists—took part in the march carrying signs that read, "We are not aliens, we are human beings" and "We have human rights." The march went from the Metropolitan Cathedral to the Plaza de los Desaparecidos.

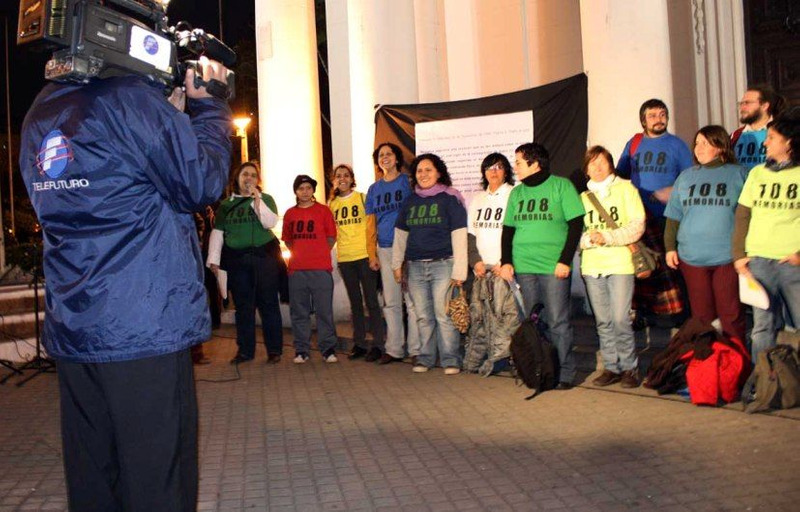
Launch of the 108 Memories Month in 2009 – Asunción, Paraguay.

The Gay, Lesbian, and Transgender Action Group (GAGLT) is another pioneering organization in this movement. Their public advocacy for LGBT rights began mobilizing in 1999.

The beginning of these mobilizations sparked activities aimed at promoting visibility of human rights and generating debate against discrimination based on sexual orientation in Paraguay.

In December 2000, a series of events for the rights of "lesbians and gays" was held in collaboration with Fundación Triángulo from Spain.

In 2003, Aireana, a lesbofeminist group, was founded. It works for lesbian rights and promotes sexual dissent so that all individuals can live in freedom and without violence. That same year, the Gay, Lesbian, and Transgender Action Group (GAGLT) held a public event in Plaza Italia. This is considered the most immediate precedent to the marches.

In 2004, a Working Group on Human Rights Organizations was created. It included the GLBT Network, Amnesty International Paraguay, the Coordinadora de Derechos Humanos del Paraguay (CODEHUPY), Aireana, and the Comunidad Homosexual del Paraguay (CHOPA). The group received support from Human Rights Watch and the International Gay and Lesbian Human Rights Commission (IGLHRC) to promote the approval of the "Resolution on sexual orientation and human rights" at the United Nations Commission on Human Rights.

== Themes Addressed in Each Edition ==
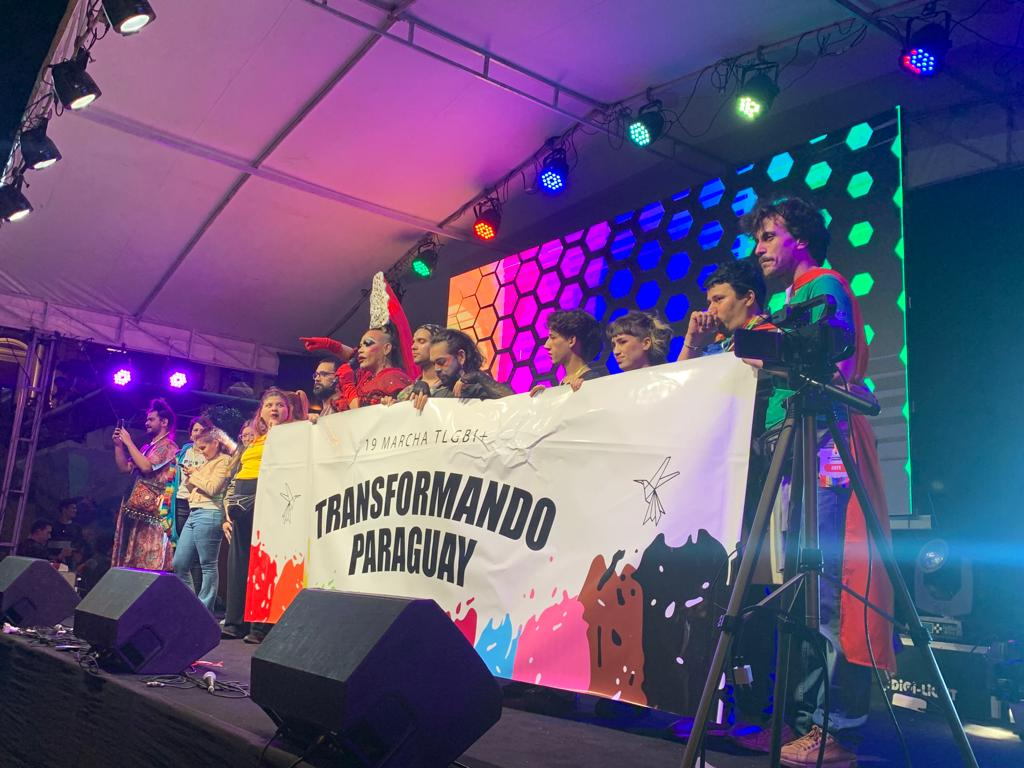
2022 slogan: Transforming Paraguay – Asunción, Paraguay.

- 2004 – March Against Discrimination: "For a Paraguayan society without discrimination"
- 2005 – A diverse citizenry deserves a safe country
- 2006 – Diversity is a fact; loving freely is a right
- 2007 – Live with pride, live with rights
- 2008 – Oîma la cambio ("Change is here"). Now, our rights
- 2009 – Choose to be free, demand your rights
- 2010 – In high heels, sneakers, or barefoot, I demand my freedom to be happy. For the human rights of lesbians, gays, bisexuals, trans, and intersex people—for diversity and non-discrimination
- 2011 – To build equality, let's celebrate diversity. For diverse families and non-discrimination
- 2012 – Pride and resistance
- 2013 – Celebrating with memory and protest
- 2014 – Diverse families exist, we demand rights
- 2015 – No more discrimination. We want a law now! Paraguay is diversity
- 2016 – 13 years marching for gender identity and all our rights
- 2017 – Faced with state terrorism: dignity and resistance
- 2018 – Memory, pride, and resistance
- 2019 – Ñamopu’â sâso oñondivepa ("Let's build freedom together")
- 2020 – Revolution and resistance
- 2021 – We are strength, resistance, and community
- 2022 – Transforming Paraguay
- 2023 – Our existence is a fact: We demand rights!
- 2024 – Ko’ápe roime ("Here we are"), for all rights. ¡Peju jabatalla! ("Come and fight!")
