= Paraguay–Peru relations =

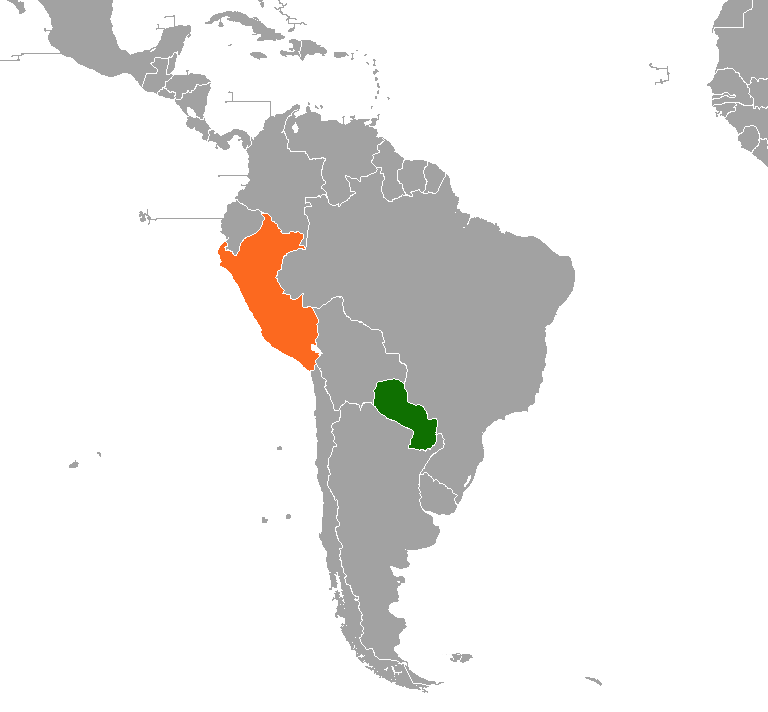

- Paraguay: Peru

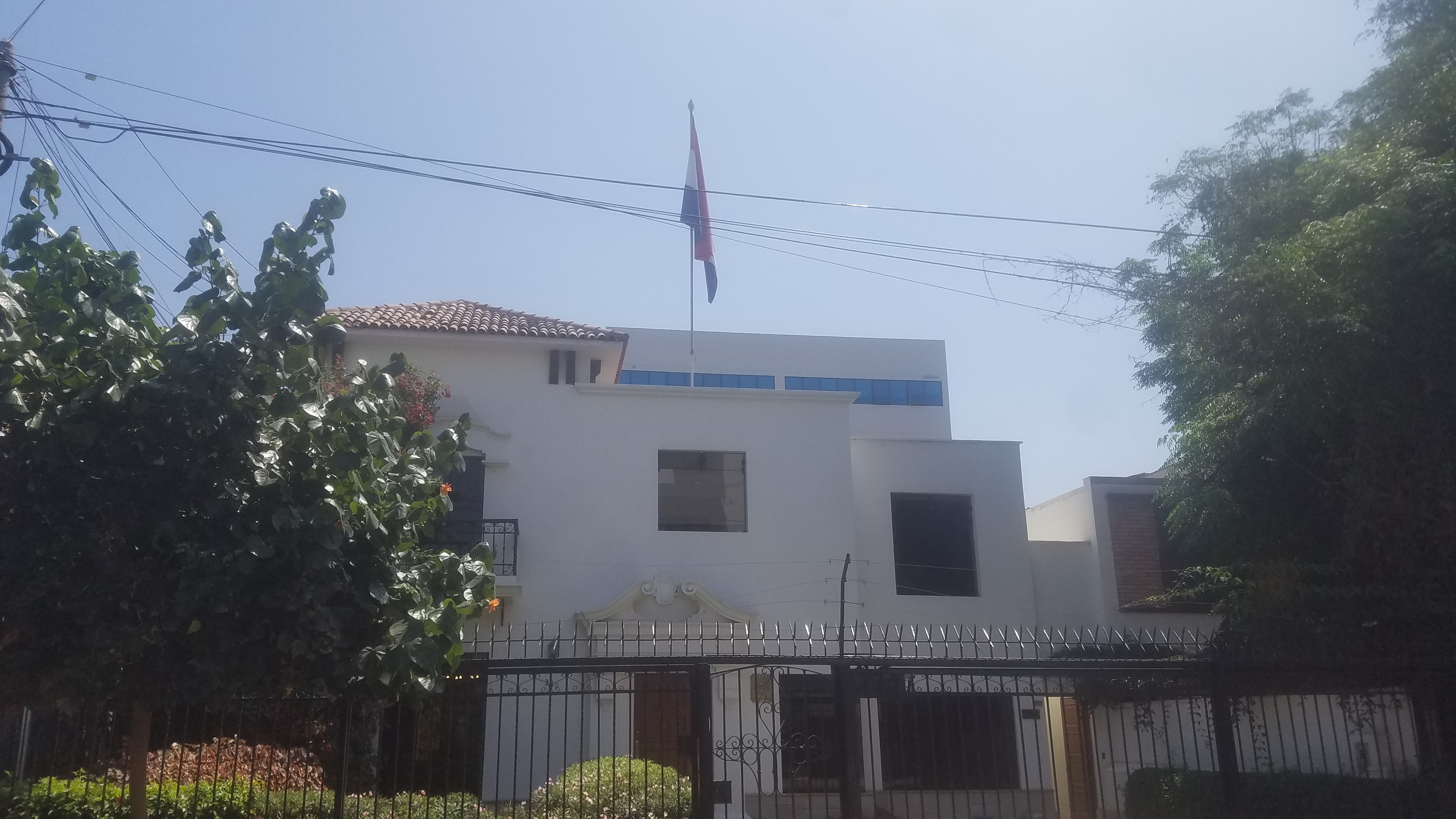
Embassy of Paraguay in Lima

Paraguay–Peru relations are foreign relations between the Republic of Paraguay and the Republic of Peru. Both countries established diplomatic relations on May 2, 1858. Paraguay has an embassy in Lima. Peru has an embassy in Asunción, and an honorary consulate in Ciudad del Este.

Both countries are full members of the Rio Group, of the Latin Union, of the Association of Spanish Language Academies, of the Organization of American States, of the Organization of Ibero-American States and of the Union of South American Nations.

== See also ==
- Foreign relations of Paraguay
- Ministry of Foreign Affairs (Peru)
- List of ambassadors of Paraguay to Peru
- List of ambassadors of Peru to Paraguay
