= Revolutionary Union (Peru) =

Revolutionary Union Unión Revolucionaria
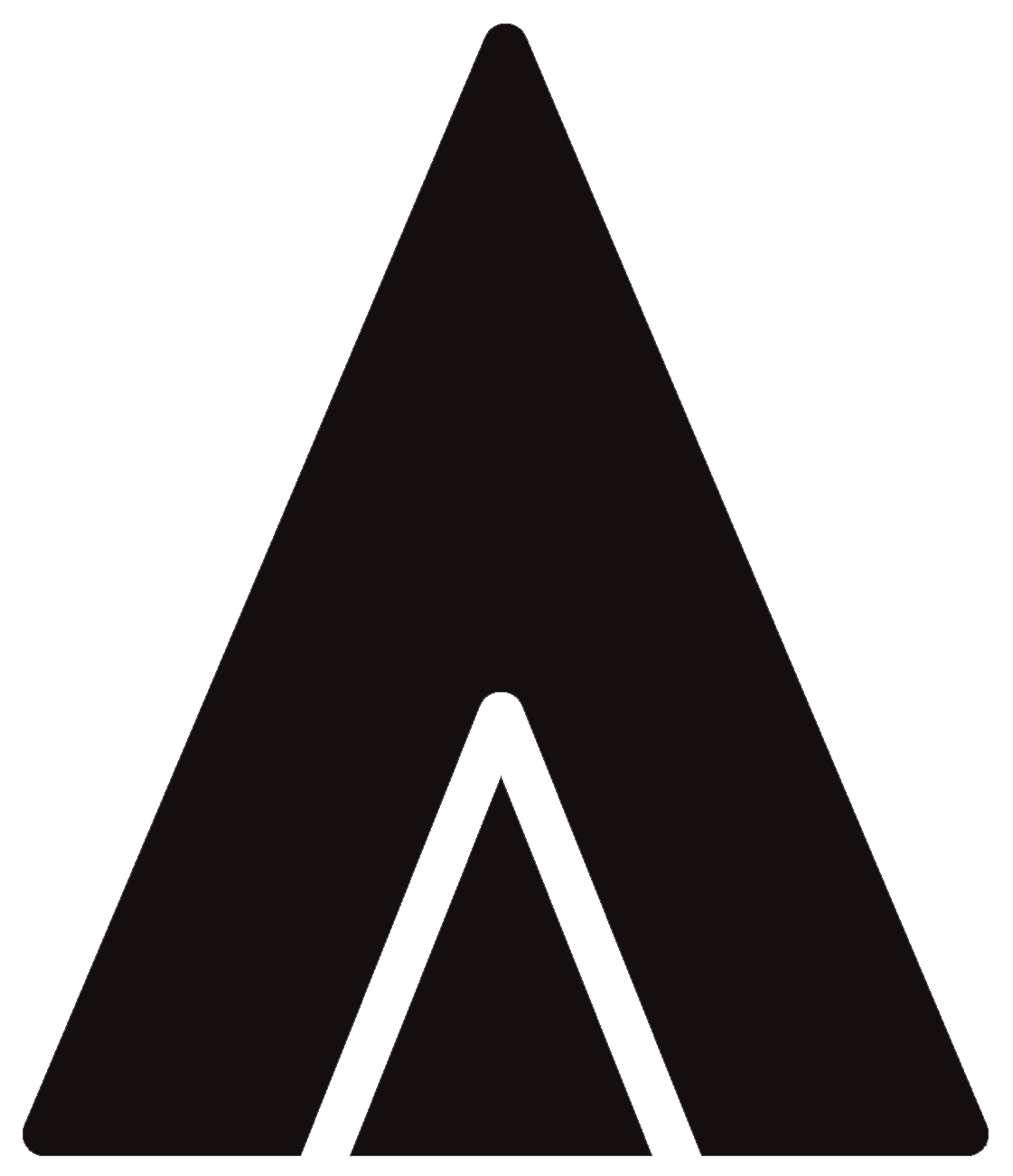
- Abbreviation: UR
- Supreme Chief: Luis A. Flores
- Founded: July 30, 1931
- Dissolved: 1956
- Headquarters: Casa Tenaud, Lima
- Newspaper: Acción
- Youth wing: Legión Juvenil Fascista
- Paramilitary wing: Black Shirts (1933–1934)
- Ideology: Sanchezcerrismo; Peruvian nationalism; Patriotism; Populism; Conservatism; Anti-capitalism; Anti-communism; Anti-Asian sentiment; Militarism; Fascism (from 1933)
- Political position: Far-right
- Colors: Black
- Slogan: "Perú para los peruanos" (unofficial) (lit. 'Peru for Peruvians')

Party flag

The Revolutionary Union (Spanish: Unión Revolucionaria, UR), was a nationalist political party in Peru founded in 1931 by Luis M. Sánchez Cerro, former president of Peru. The party was formed following the coup with which Sanchez Cerro overthrew the eleven-year dictatorship of Augusto B. Leguía. Initially an authoritarian-populist organization, the party later transitioned towards fascism following the assassination of its founder, with Luis A. Flores assuming leadership in 1933 and consolidating this ideological shift.

As a mass movement, the UR drew significant support from many different groups in Peruvian society, included rural communities, individuals from the Andean and southern regions, women, the unemployed, marginalized groups (lumpen), as well as former civilistas and conservatives. In the elections of 1931, Sánchez Cerro obtained more than 150,000 votes, allowing the aforementioned candidate to lead a second government. The party maintained a populist and nationalist character, and displayed a staunch opposition towards communism and the APRA, organizing armed groups to combat said movements. The UR organized impoverished social sectors in both urban and rural areas. It carried out extensive work among poor women, urban marginalized groups and yanaconas.

The assassination of Sanchez Cerro at the hands of an aprista militant and the assumption of power of the party by Luis A. Flores lead an ideological transition towards fascism. Highly inspired in Italian fascism, the party adopted a similar paramilitary branch called the Legión de Camisas Negras ("Blackshirt Legion"). The UR openly advocated for an armed struggle against leftist forces, under the slogan that fascism means “religiosity, conservatism, and right-wing conduct”. By 1936, the UR had at least 6,000 members among their armed groups. In the elections of that year, Flores lost in second place against Luis Antonio Eguiguren, although the elections were later annulled by the government of Óscar R. Benavides, who would reform the 1933 constitution to extend his term by an additional three years.

The UR saw a loss of support after failure in the elections of 1936. Following the extension of the Benavides’ government, some of the most prominent leaders of both the UR and the APRA would be deported. Deprived of charismatic leadership and overshadowed in popular favour by the new regime's achievements, the UR began a decline that ultimately led to its disappearance in 1956.

== History ==
The party was founded in 1931 by Luis Miguel Sánchez Cerro and became the governing party that same year. It took part in elections in 1931 and 1945.

In 1933 the leadership was taken over by Luis A. Flores. The party was anti-democratic, supporting fascism, nationalism and populism. Revolutionary Union started its own Blackshirts paramilitary arm as a copy of the Italian group and would also use the Roman salute like other fascist movements use.

The Union first achieved its political victories in the 1930s. It formed the National Democratic Front coalition beside APRA and the Reformist Democratic Party, resulting in José Luis Bustamante y Rivero becoming president. After losing support in the 1936 Peruvian general election, the party would see its supporters move to the Peruvian Fascist Brotherhood of José de la Riva-Agüero y Osma.

On December 7, 1945, the group's headquarters, located at the Casa Tenaud, was attacked by sympathisers of the American Popular Revolutionary Alliance, who used incendiary devices and dynamite to attack the building and later made it difficult for firemen to carry out their duties and put out the flames. Consequently, the unsalvageable building was later demolished, being replaced by the 20-storey Anglo–Peruvian building.
