= Gloria Rubin =

Paraguayuan broadcasting executive and politician (born 1943)

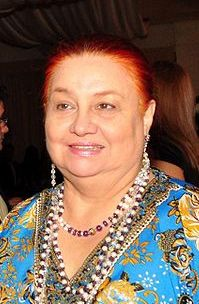

Secretary for Women, Paraguay
- In office 2008–2013
- Succeeded by: Ana María Baiardi

Personal details
- Born: 1943 (age 82–83)

Gloria Beatriz Godoy Montórfano de Rubín (born 1943) is a Paraguayuan broadcasting executive, psychologist, feminist, and politician. From 2008 to 2013 she was Paraguay's Minister for Women's Affairs.

== Life ==
Gloria Godoy was born on 26 March 1943 in Asunción. She is the niece of Adán Godoy Jiménez, Minister of Health under Paraguay's dictator Alfredo Stroessner.

She is married to the broadcaster and celebrity Humberto Rubín, owner of Radio Ñandutí, and they have four children. She herself worked for Radio Ñandutí.

In 2008 Gloria Godoy de Rubín was appointed minister for women in the government of Fernando Lugo. She objected to an invitation to Luga's inauguration being extended to Nicaraguan president Daniel Ortega, who was accused of raping his stepdaughter Zoilamérica Narváez.

After the 2012 parliamentary coup removed Lugo as president, Rubin offered her resignation, but eventually elected to stay on as minister under Federico Franco. In 2013 president Horacio Cartes replaced her as minister, appointing Ana María Baiardi as minister for women.
