= List of ambassadors of Paraguay to Peru =

Ambassador of Paraguay to Peru
- Coat of Arms of Paraguay
- Incumbent; Rubén Ortiz Méndez since December 27, 2022
- Inaugural holder: César Gondra
- Formation: 1898

The Paraguayan ambassador in Lima is the official representative of the Government in Asunción to the Government of Peru.

Both countries established relations on November 13, 1858, which have continued since. During the Paraguayan War, the Peruvian Minister of Foreign Affairs, José Toribio Pacheco, made a statement defending the country in 1866.

== List of representatives ==
Name	Term begin	Term end	President	Notes
César Gondra	December 17, 1898	June 1899	Juan Bautista Egusquiza	First representative to Peru.
Juan Cogorno	June 21, 1902	June 15, 1904	Andrés Héctor Carvallo	
Pedro Peña	May 2, 1905	August 31, 1908	Juan Bautista Gaona	
Cipriano Ibáñez	July 14, 1911	March 23, 1912	Liberato Marcial Rojas	
Fulgencio R. Moreno	February 27, 1913	January 19, 1915	Eduardo Schaerer	
Fulgencio R. Moreno	January 23, 1918	October 20, 1921	Manuel Franco	
Modesto Guggiari	June 17, 1924	November 3, 1924	Luis Alberto Riart	
Eusebio Ayala	1924	1924	Eligio Ayala	Sent to the 1924 commemoration of the Battle of Ayacucho.
Juan Vicente Ramirez	March 30, 1925	August 12, 1925	Eligio Ayala	
J. Isidro Ramírez	April 22, 1927	December 16, 1930	Eligio Ayala	
Rogelio Ibarra	July 24, 1931	February 6, 1933	José Patricio Guggiari	
J. Isidro Ramírez	July 14, 1934	April 7, 1936	Eusebio Ayala	
Alfredo Jacquet	June 8, 1937	September 10, 1937	Rafael Franco	
Francisco Esculies	November 10, 1937	1938	Félix Paiva	
Miguel Ángel Gatti	February 1, 1940	April 24, 1940	José Félix Estigarribia	As chargé d'affaires.
Luis Irrazábal	April 24, 1940	October 18, 1943	José Félix Estigarribia	
Luis Irrazábal	October 18, 1943	April 8, 1949	Higinio Morinigo	First ambassador of Paraguay to Peru.
Fernando Vallejo	April 29, 1949	February 9, 1953	Felipe Molas López	
Raúl Peña	February 27, 1954	December 30, 1954	Alfredo Stroessner	
Wenceslao Benites	December 30, 1954	October 2, 1956	Alfredo Stroessner	
Víctor Morínigo	October 2, 1956	September 7, 1959	Alfredo Stroessner	
Emilio Díaz de Vivar	October 7, 1959	September 7, 1962	Alfredo Stroessner	
Fernando Vallejo	September 7, 1962	October 10, 1966	Alfredo Stroessner	Vallejo presented his credentials on October 5, 1962.
Carlos Díaz de Bedoya	October 10, 1966	March 30, 1968	Alfredo Stroessner	
Fermín Dos Santos	September 23, 1968	August 26, 1974	Alfredo Stroessner	
Manuel Ávila	October 11, 1974	April 29, 1986	Alfredo Stroessner	
Miguel T. Romero	April 29, 1986	July 18, 1989	Alfredo Stroessner	
Julio Peña	March 15, 1993	August 30, 1996	Andrés Rodríguez	
José María Fernández	September 10, 1996	August 16, 1998	Juan Carlos Wasmosy	
Julia Velilla Laconich	August 7, 2000	March 12, 2008	Luis Ángel González Macchi	
Modesto Luis Guggiari Zavala	January 15, 2010	November 15, 2010	Fernando Lugo	Guggiari was named on September 11, 2009, presenting his credentials on January 15, 2010. He ultimately quit in April 2010.
Felipe Santiago Jara Agüero			Fernando Lugo	As chargé d'affaires.
Ricardo Scavone Yegros			Federico Franco	As chargé d'affaires.
Julio Duarte Van Humbeck	February 25, 2015	2018	Horacio Cartes	
Ana María Baiardi	July 18, 2018	2022	Horacio Cartes	
Rubén Ortiz Méndez	December 27, 2022	Incumbent	Mario Abdo Benítez	

== See also ==
- List of ambassadors of Peru to Paraguay

== Bibliography ==
- Scavone Yagros, Ricardo (2022). Paraguay y Perú: de la primera misión diplomática a los gobiernos de Stroessner y Belaunde (1862-1963) (PDF) (in Spanish) (1st ed.). Lima: Editorial Tiempo de Historia. ISBN 978-9972-671-93-7.
