= 1936 Peruvian general election =

- 11 October 1936
- Presidential election
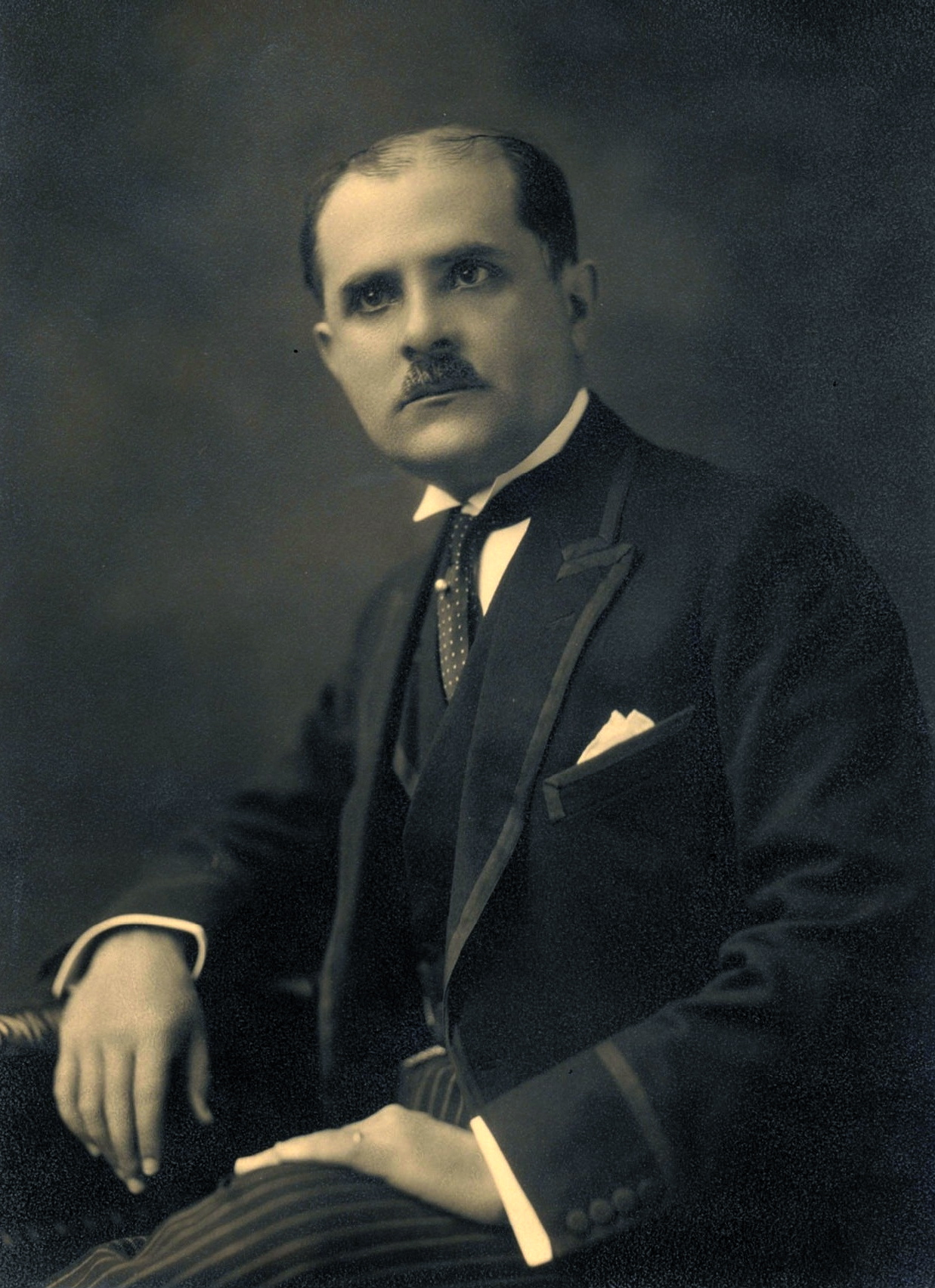

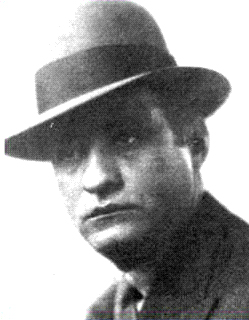

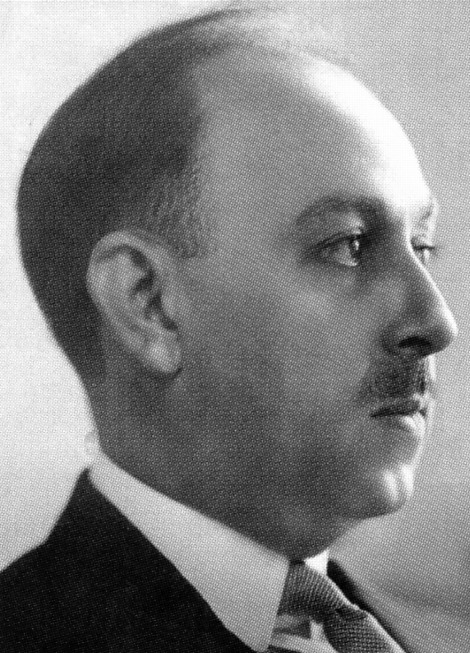

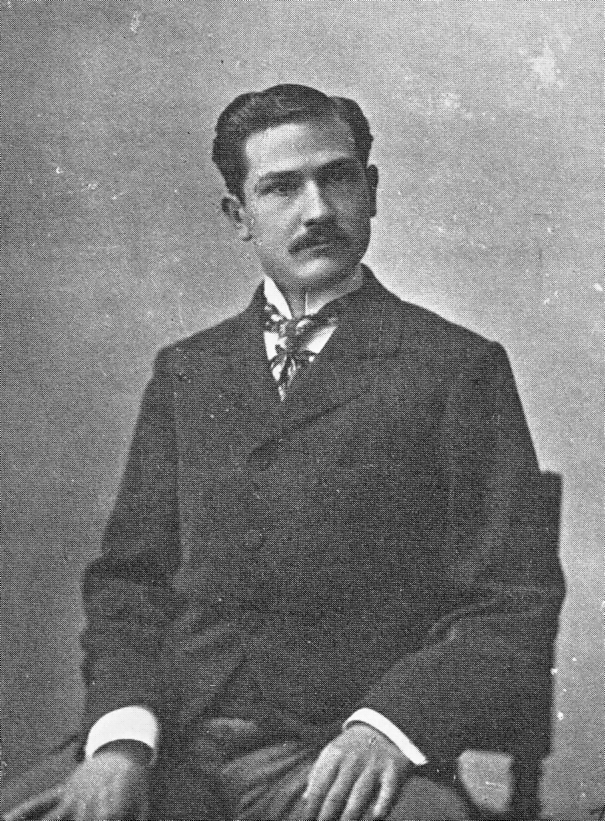
Nominee	Luis A. Eguiguren	Luis A. Flores
Party	Social Democratic	Revolutionary Union
Popular vote	76,042	57,838
Percentage	37.13%	29.1%
Nominee	Jorge Prado Ugarteche	Manuel Vicente Villarán
Party	Conservative	Independent
Popular vote	57,838	30,803
Percentage	20.7%	13.1%
President before election
Óscar R. Benavides
Military junta
Elected President
Election results annulled

General elections were held in Peru on 11 October 1936. In the presidential election, Luis A. Eguiguren of the Social Democratic Party appeared to be heading for victory, but outgoing president Óscar R. Benavides who favored Jorge Prado Ugarteche, ordered the count to be stopped and the election results were subsequently annulled. Benavides subsequently stayed in power as president.

== Background ==
Incumbent president Benavides' term of office was due to expire in December 1936. He announced that he would not run for re-election and called elections for 11 October. There were eighteen political parties in existence, but most ran as alliances in the election.

Four candidates were approved to run for office. The election commission barred Víctor Raúl Haya de la Torre of the American Popular Revolutionary Alliance (APRA) on 5 September 1936 under article 53 of the constitution, which banned 'international parties'. The APRA subsequently convinced Luis Antonio Eguiguren to disown the National Front of Jorge Prado Ugarteche and organise his own Democratic Front, which the APRA called for its members to vote for.

== Results ==
=== President ===
When it appeared Eguiguren was winning, Benavides ordered the count to be suspended on the basis that members of the banned APRA had voted for him. At the point it was stopped on 21 October, with 70 of the 119 provinces having completed the count, Eguiguren had 74,485 votes, or 37% of the total.

Candidate	Party	Votes	%
Luis A. Eguiguren	Social Democratic Party	76,042	35.96
Luis A. Flores	Conservative Coalition	57,838	27.35
Jorge Prado Ugarteche	Revolutionary Union	46,773	22.12
Manuel Vicente Villarán	Independent	30,803	14.57
Total		211,456	100.00

== Aftermath ==
Under pressure from Benavides, on 4 November the outgoing Congress met and declared the election annulled. A motion by the Revolutionary Union that accused Benavides of having "presented the presidential and parliamentary elections of the period 1936–1941" was defeated by 64 votes to 13. Benavides subsequently forced Congress to pass a law extending his term until 1939 and then dissolved the legislature, instead ruling by decree and forming a new all-military government.
