= List of ambassadors of Paraguay to Italy =

Coordinates: 41.903100°N 12.493418°E

Ambassador of Paraguay to Italy
- Coat of Arms of Paraguay
- Incumbent; Roberto Carlos Palacios since September 10, 2018
- Inaugural holder: Francisco Solano López
- Formation: 1853

The Paraguayan ambassador in Rome is the official representative of the Government in Asunción to the Government of Italy.

The Paraguayan ambassador next to the government in Rome, with residence in Rome is concurrently accredited to the governments in San Marino, Jerusalem, Ljubljana (Slovenia), Athens and Bucharest.

== List of representatives ==
| Diplomatic accreditation | Ambassador | Observations | President of Paraguay | List of prime ministers of Italy | Term end |
|---|---|---|---|---|---|
| 1853 | Francisco Solano López | Minister Plenipotentiary to the Kingdom of Sardinia | Carlos Antonio López | Camillo Benso, Count of Cavour | 1855 |
| 1903 | José Irala | Minister Plenipotentiary | Andrés Héctor Carvallo | Giovanni Giolitti | 1905 |
| 1918 | Cecilio Báez | Minister Plenipotentiary | Manuel Franco | Vittorio Emanuele Orlando | 1920 |
| 1920 | Héctor Velázquez | Minister Plenipotentiary | Manuel Gondra | Francesco Saverio Nitti | 1920 |
| 1920 | José P. Montero | Minister Plenipotentiary | Manuel Gondra | Francesco Saverio Nitti | 1922 |
| 1925 | Justo Pastor Benítez | Chargé d'affaires | Luis Alberto Riart | Benito Mussolini | 1927 |
| 1930 | Andrés Gubetich | Chargé d'affaires | José Patricio Guggiari | Benito Mussolini | 1933 |
| 1936 | Juan E. O'Leary | Minister Plenipotentiary | Rafael Franco | Benito Mussolini | 1937 |
| 1947 | Juan E. O'Leary | Minister Plenipotentiary | Higinio Morínigo | Ferruccio Parri | 1948 |
| 1951 | José Virgilio Cataldi | Minister Plenipotentiary | Raimundo Rolón | Ferruccio Parri | 1954 |
| 1954 | Ramiro Recalde de Vargas | Minister Plenipotentiary | Alfredo Stroessner | Amintore Fanfani | 1958 |
| 1958 | Ramiro Recalde de Vargas | Ambassador | Alfredo Stroessner | Amintore Fanfani | 1960 |
| 1960 | Víctor Morínigo | | Alfredo Stroessner | Fernando Tambroni | 1963 |
| 1963 | Silvio Lofruscio | | Alfredo Stroessner | Giovanni Leone | 1968 |
| 1969 | Luis Martínez Miltos | | Alfredo Stroessner | Giovanni Leone | 1978 |
| 1981 | Roque J. Yódice Codas | | Alfredo Stroessner | Giovanni Spadolini | 1986 |
| 1987 | Aníbal Fernández | son of Horacio Aníbal Fernández (b. Asunción, April 3, 1905) lawyer, public accountant. President of the Chamber of Deputies. From November 14, 1939 to November 28, 1940 Paraguayan ambassador to the United States, University professor. | Alfredo Stroessner | Amintore Fanfani | 1989 |
| 1989 | Pascual Scavone | | Andrés Rodríguez | Giulio Andreotti | 1991 |
| 1991 | José Zanotti-Cavazzoni | | Andrés Rodríguez | Giulio Andreotti | 1995 |
| 1995 | Óscar Cabello Sarubbi | | Juan Carlos Wasmosy | Lamberto Dini | 1999 |
| 1999 | Lilia Romero Pereira | Ambassadrice | Luis Ángel González Macchi | Massimo D'Alema | 2004 |
| 2004 | Jorge Figueredo Fratta | | Nicanor Duarte Frutos | Silvio Berlusconi | 2007 |
| February 8, 2008 | Ana María Baiardi | Ambassadrice | Nicanor Duarte Frutos | Romano Prodi | 2013 |
| July 15, 2015 | Martín Raúl Llano-Heyn | | Horacio Cartes | Matteo Renzi | 2017 |
| September 10, 2018 | Roberto Carlos Palacios | | Mario Abdo Benitez | Giuseppe Conte | |
