= Aireana =

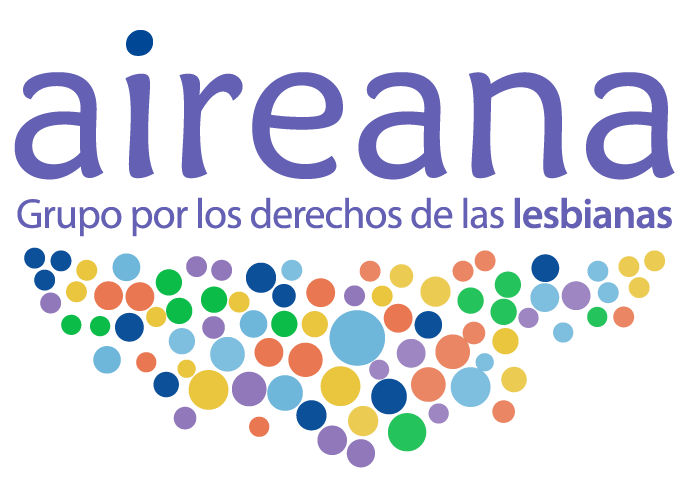

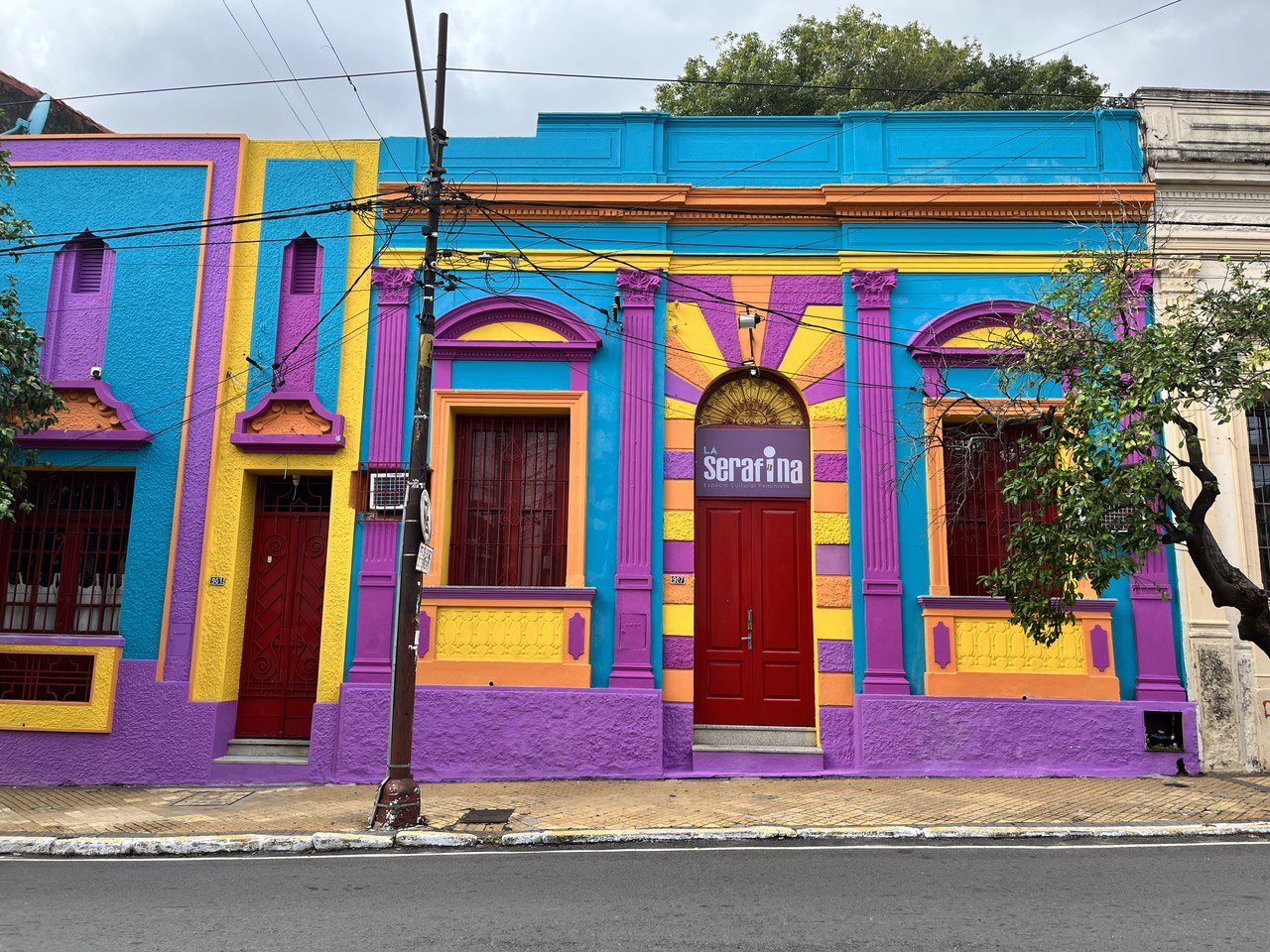
- Aireana cultural center in La Serafina, Asunción
- Established: February 2003
- Headquarters: Asunción
- Location: Paraguay
- Fields: LGBT+ rights
- Website: www.aireana.org.py

Aireana is a feminist organization founded in 2003 in Asunción, Paraguay. Its advocates for the rights of LGBT+ people. It organizes various cultural activities, meetings, and festivals for the community.

== History ==
Aireana was established in February 2003 by a group of Lesbians with a focus on the rights of the LGBT+ people. The organization came into public view, when it congratulated María José Argaña Mateu, the Paraguayan minister for women, when she said in an interview that she would support the civil union between people of the same sex. The organization was legally recognized in 2006.

== Activities ==
Aireana engages in various activities such as advocating for the rights of LGBT+ community through art and culture, creation of safe spaces for the community in Asunción, multimedia initiatives such as the production of podcasts, plays, among others, and support for people encountering gender-based violence. It organizes meetings in collaboration with other feminist organizations in Paraguay.

La Serafina is a cultural space dedicated for the community that was established by Aireana in 2005. It carries out initiatives in the field of theatre, music, dance, poetry and exhibitions and is located in the same building as the headquarters of the organization.

It organizes the LesBiGayTrans International Film Festival of Asunción since 2005. It is a week-long festival that is held annually at the Cultural Center of Spain Juan de Salazar, and showcases independent film productions based on the LGBT+ theme, and awards for the best films.

Cultural Fridays have been organized by Aireana since 2012 which showcases artistic expressions such as concerts, theater, poetry, and dance by the LGBTIQA+ community. La Tatucada is a percussion group that often engages in public displays during feminist initiatives such as the International Women's Day March, and the Asunción LGBT Pride March.

The organization has been involved in the drafting of the Annual Report on the situation of human rights in Paraguay, along with the Human Rights Coordinator of Paraguay since 2016.

== Awards and recognition ==
The organization was awarded by the Government of France for its work on human rights in 2011.
