= Servicio Exterior de Falange =

Organisation of the FET y de las JONS

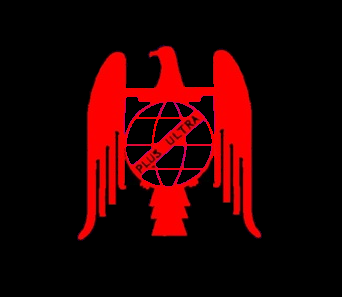
- Emblem of the Servicio Exterior de Falange

National Delegate overview
- Formed: 1935–1936
- Dissolved: 10 December 1945
- Headquarters: No. 42 Alcalá Street Madrid
- Parent department: Falange (until 1937); FET and of the JONS (1938–45)

The Servicio Exterior de Falange (Note: Later, after the establishment of FET y de las JONS, it was called the Delegación Nacional del Servicio Exterior de Falange (DNSEF; National Delegation of the Phalanx Foreign Service). Naranjo Orovio 1988, p. 9.) (English: Phalanx Foreign Service), sometimes known simply as the Falange Exterior, was an organisation of the FET y de las JONS, the ruling political party of Francoist Spain. It was in charge of coordinating the actions of the various Falange delegations that existed outside Spanish territory.

Founded at the dawn of the Civil War, after the outbreak of the conflict the organization was reorganized according to the needs of the time, serving as liaison for the Falange sections abroad. During those years it developed an active propaganda work abroad. During World War II, it played a relevant role, especially among Spanish populations in South America and the Philippines. The Servicio Exterior was also involved in other types of operations, such as the kidnapping of children evacuated abroad by the Republic.

== History ==
=== Origins and early years ===
Some authors place the creation of the Servicio Exterior de Falange as early as August 1935, while others establish that it was in October 1936, with the mission of grouping together the Falange delegations already existing abroad. Wayne H. Bowen points out that it was not formally organized until the beginning of 1937, and that until then the functions of coordination of the existing organizations abroad were exercised since the summer of 1936 by the Jefatura Nacional de Prensa y Propaganda (National Press and Propaganda Headquarters), headed by Luis Casaús Ardura. It was not until February 1937 that the national leader of the Falange, Manuel Hedilla, appointed a head to take charge of the Falange organization abroad: Felipe Ximénez de Sandoval. In its first moments of existence, the Servicio Exterior de Falange maintained many similarities with the Auslandsorganisation (AO) of the German Nazi Party, but also with the Fasci all'Estero of the National Fascist Party.

After the Decree of Unification, in the summer of 1937 the Servicio Exterior was framed as an organism of the new party of Franco's regime, FET y de las JONS. It was renamed the Delegación Nacional del Servicio Exterior de Falange (DNSEF). Several delegations of the party were organized in various countries abroad, and in time these ended up becoming an instrument of the Francoist state abroad. José del Castaño Cardona, a career diplomat, would soon replace Ximénez de Sandoval as head of the organization in August 1937. The Falange Exterior already played an important role by then, as it coordinated and controlled the different Falange organizations that existed abroad. Some of the functions it performed were of a military nature, such as surveillance operations, covert repression, aggression, espionage and counter-espionage. Thus, all activities carried out by the Falange abroad were to be carried out through its Servicio Exterior. However, all Falangists leaving Spain on official missions were forbidden to wear their uniforms, as well as to come into contact with members of political organizations in other countries. Initially, the DNSEF acted in parallel to Franco's diplomacy, until 18 May 1938, when the Burgos government issued a report establishing that all Falange delegations abroad would be subordinated to Franco's diplomatic representatives.

Towards the end of the civil war the Servicio Exterior had managed to establish numerous sections abroad, mainly in South American countries. The main South American delegation of FET y de las JONS was in Uruguay, with about 1,000 members, compared to about 4,000 members in the rest of South America. In Argentina there were about sixty delegations of FET y de las JONS around 1939. Historian Stanley G. Payne has pointed out that the influence of these delegations led to the creation of independent Latin American parties inspired by Falangism, such as the Bolivian Socialist Falange or the Chilean National Falange. In contrast, by 1939 some Falange delegations had run into opposition from local authorities. This was the case of the governments of Cuba and Mexico, countries not very receptive to Franco's regime, which in fact ended up expelling several Falangist agents.

However, it was the Servicio Exterior de Falange who played the leading role in the regime's propaganda activities in Latin America.

The end of the civil war brought changes in the DNSEF: in May 1939 José del Castaño was replaced by Rafael Sánchez Mazas, and del Castaño became Inspector General of Falange Exterior, a post he would hold until the end of 1940. Another of the consequences of the end of the war was that the Servicio Exterior ceased to appear as an organization that defended the Francoist side, and came to be considered merely as the foreign organization of the single party of the Francoist Dictatorship, a regime that was also closely linked to the fascist powers. This circumstance would end up generating problems for the Falange Exterior.

=== World War II ===
After the end of the conflict, the headquarters of the organization, previously located in Salamanca, Burgos and San Sebastián, was installed in 1940 at 42 Alcalá Street –formerly the headquarters of the Círculo de Bellas Artes–, in Madrid. Shortly after the beginning of the Second World War, in September 1939 Ricardo Giménez-Arnau was chosen to head the Servicio Exterior, replacing Sánchez Mazas. During the first years of the war, under the protection of the German victories in Europe and the influence of the fascist powers, Falange tried to take advantage of that context to strengthen its action abroad.

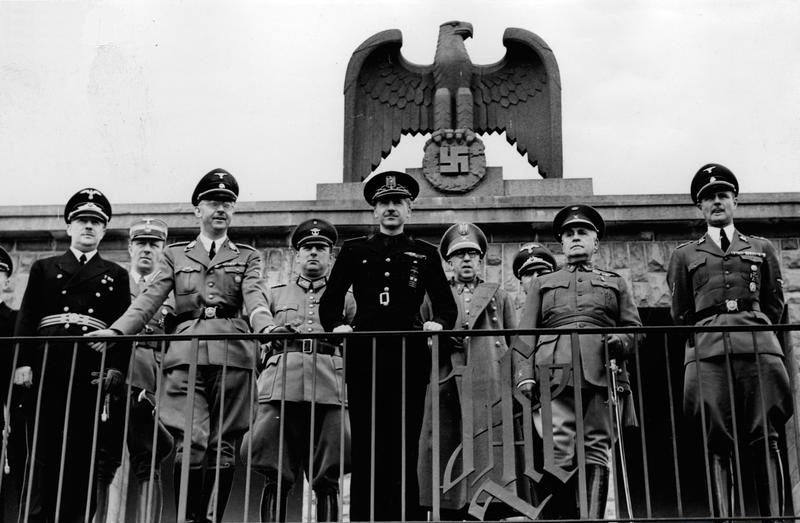
Serrano Suñer and Himmler, together with other officers at the headquarters of the "Adolf Hitler" division in Berlin (1940)

By 1940 the new Minister of Foreign Affairs, Serrano Suñer, gave a new impetus to the organization. One consequence of this new policy was an increase in the budget of the foreign organization, and the consequent intensification of its activities. In addition, he brought back Ximénez de Sandoval –now his chief of staff–, and in August 1941 he put him back in charge of the Falange Exterior. Serrano Suñer encouraged through the Falange Exterior the promotion of "Hispanism" in the countries of Latin America, and especially a more bellicose and anti-American Hispanism. The organization became an instrument of the Franco regime to spread its ideology throughout Latin American countries.

The Falange Exterior also developed an important activity in the Axis countries, despite the war situation. It was very active in Germany, Morocco, Portugal and Italy. Latin America was a region of special activity for the Falange. The regime sought to recover the former privileged relationship that Spain had in this area, as well as to reinforce its image abroad, and to strengthen its political position before the "New Order" that the Axis Powers were organizing in Europe. However, the reaction of many Latin American countries to Fascist influence –and also the increasing lack of resources– seriously affected the activity of the Falange Exterior. Thus, to the detriment of political activity, they ended up opting to use cultural coverage as a platform from which to continue radiating ideological approaches. This, however, did not minimize the rejection in America. The threat of the fascist powers also began to be taken into account by the U.S. State Department, which considered Franco's foreign policy in South America as an instrument of Nazi Germany and fascist Italy. Thus, at the VIII Pan-American Conference, Secretary of State Cordell Hull insisted on the need to take measures to prevent the infiltration of the Axis Powers in the American continent. Although Falangist activities in Latin America were not related to Nazi Germany, it is certain that the Pan-Hispanic doctrine of the Falange was welcomed by the Latin American ruling elites, and constituted a challenge to North American hegemony in the area.

The distrust of the Spanish-American governments went a step further when at the end of 1941 the authorities of several countries outlawed the local branches of the Nazi Party and the Falange.

The possibility of Spanish intervention in the conflict also became a matter of concern for the United States, which investigated the activities of the Falange in Latin America, especially in Puerto Rico, where pro-Falange and pro-Franco sentiments were high, even among the ruling classes. Some Falangists promoted the idea of supporting the struggle of the former Spanish colonies against American domination. However, the reality of post-war Spain was that the Francoist state was not in an economic position to carry out an extensive propaganda campaign; this was compounded by the determined opposition of the liberal elites and leftist movements. In addition to the activities in South America, this situation also occurred in other territories. For example, before the outbreak of the world war, support for Franco and the Falange was high among the Spanish community in the Philippines. Through the "Philippine Falange", the Servicio Exterior de Falange even collaborated with the Japanese forces in their fight against the U.S. military forces during the conquest of the Philippines in 1942.

=== Decline and final years ===
Serrano Suñer fell into disgrace and in September 1942 he was removed from all his posts, being replaced by Francisco Gómez-Jordana. This meant a change in the policy of the Ministry of Foreign Affairs, in contrast to Serrano's previous pro-Nazi stance. Ximénez de Sandoval had also seen his diplomatic career cut short in March 1942, after an incident. (Note: Apparently the incident would have been a fight between Falangists and royalists in which Ximénez de Sandoval himself would have intervened. Payne (1999, p. 376)) During the rest of the war, Fernando María Castiella (1942–1943) and Antonio Riestra del Moral (1943–1945) were in charge of the Servicio Exterior. Very weakened compared to its situation at the beginning of the war, the Servicio Exterior continued to develop its actions abroad, although each time in a more difficult context, and with a greater lack of funds. The subversive activities of the Falange in Spanish America were one of the reasons that led the Americans –there were also other reasons, especially the so-called Laurel incident– to impose an oil embargo on Franco's Spain in 1944. In March of that year, U.S. Attorney General Francis Biddle went so far as to accuse the Falange of being behind a number of incidents and events that had taken place in Latin America, such as the sinarchist movement in Mexico or the United Officers Group in Argentina.

After the end of World War II, the activities of the Servicio Exterior were greatly reduced and it was finally disbanded on 10 December 1945.

== Repatriation and abduction of children ==
During the war, the Republican authorities had carried out the evacuation of thousands of minors to foreign countries, such as France, Great Britain, Belgium or the Soviet Union. Even before the end of the war, Franco's government tried to repatriate minors and return them to Spain, although it sometimes encountered many difficulties in achieving this goal. From 1941 onwards, the Delegación Extraordinaria de Repatriación (Extraordinary Repatriation Delegation) became directly dependent on the Falange Exterior, so it was the latter's personnel who carried out the task of locating and repatriating the evacuated children. From this moment on, the number of repatriated children increased considerably. Among the main receiving countries of children evacuated by the Republic were France, the United Kingdom, Switzerland and Belgium, whose authorities cooperated closely with the Franco regime in the repatriation. (Note: The other two countries with the largest number of children taken in were the Soviet Union and Mexico, which never cooperated with Franco's authorities.Polo Blanco (2006, pp. 97–100)) However, in many cases the host families refused to cede custody of the children to Franco's representatives. This led the Servicio Exterior de Falange to take charge of this task, even going so far as to bet on clandestine operations and even kidnapping to obtain the repatriation of the greatest number of minors.

== Organization ==
Wherever an external delegation of the Falange was created, the complete party structure had been reproduced, except for the militia organization. Thus, the external delegations had a secretariat and a treasurer, as well as immigrant aid services –with the aim of attracting those immigrants with a precarious economic situation– and delegations of the Women's Section, the Auxilio Social and the Frente de Juventudes. The scale of chiefs was also reproduced abroad, with external regional headquarters, external provincial [regional] headquarters, and a territorial chief at the head of the entire organization in each territory.

The Falange Exterior had an extensive network of charitable and social services. Its delegations abroad came to have aid services such as the Hermandad Exterior –in charge of charity with the indigent–, the Health Service, the Delegation of Culture and Recreation –which had educational and propaganda purposes–, or the famous Sección Femenina (Female Section). These aid organizations also carried out other tasks, such as the granting of scholarships of different types, or even the repatriation to the peninsula of Spaniards without resources –although the activity took place in very small numbers–. It also had its own propaganda organs abroad.

Through the Servicio Exterior numerous publications of Falangist ideology were published abroad. One of these publications, the magazine Arriba España, was published in Buenos Aires, Havana, La Paz, Panama, San José de Costa Rica, etc. Two publications were published in the Philippines: Yugo, and later Amanecer. From 22 February 1943, a Boletín de Información del Servicio Exterior de Falange, directed by Enrique Llovet, was published.

=== External delegations ===
Beginning in November 1937, provincial headquarters were established in Italy, Argentina, Cuba, Chile, Brazil and Uruguay. Later, new headquarters were established in Germany, Portugal, the United Kingdom and several Central American countries. In Puerto Rico, a territory under U.S. control, it had an important presence and activity. However, the Falange's activities in Puerto Rico began to be drastically reduced after September 1942. In Spanish Morocco it also had an important presence. In Nazi Germany, on the other hand, the Falange Exterior had an important network with centers in several German cities, such as Berlin and Hamburg. Berlin was the center of the Falange in Germany, and there they had a large headquarters located in Rankestraße, inaugurated in April 1939. However, by that time, in view of its large size, the organization needed to be restructured: in November 1938 the organization of the Falange in Germany was thoroughly reorganized. In Fascist Italy it had branches in several important cities, initially headed by the Marquis de Zayas.

In the Asia-Pacific region the main section of the Falange Exterior operated in the Philippines, from 1936. A foreign section was also established in Japan, with Eduardo Herrera de la Rosa –former military attachment at the Spanish embassy in Tokyo– leading the organization in Japanese territory, since 1938.

Many of the sections of the Falange in Latin America were born under the protection of the Servicio Exterior de Falange, although this was not the case for all of them. In the case of Argentina, for example, at the beginning of July 1936 –before the outbreak of the Civil War– an "Argentine Section of FE de las JONS" was already functioning, formed by some members of the Spanish colony who maintained contacts with Argentine nationalists. Thereafter, more Falangists moved to Argentina and developed an active work in this country. By October 1938 the Falange had established some sixty delegations throughout the country. In May 1939 the Argentine government approved a decree by which the State took control over all those foreign associations. The activities of FET y de las JONS in the country were suspended a few months later, although a new entity was created –the Hermandad Hispano-Argentina– under whose cover political activities could continue.

Another Latin American country where the Falange was very active was Cuba. A local section of the party was active there as early as June 1936; during the civil war in Spain it suffered numerous internal conflicts and even some splits. However, the Falange in Cuba saw the end of its activities in August 1941, as a consequence of the controversy and the bad image that surrounded this party. In the context of the Second World War −1942– the situation on the island reached such a point that even American diplomats accused the whole Spanish community of being anti-Cuban and of giving protection to the agents of the Nazi Gestapo.

=== National delegates ===
Name	Took office	Left office	Notes
Felipe Ximénez de Sandoval	January 1937	August 1937	1st time
José del Castaño Cardona	15 August 1937	27 May 1939	
Rafael Sánchez Mazas	27 May 1939	9 September 1939	
Ricardo Giménez-Arnau	September 1939	July 1941	
Felipe Ximénez de Sandoval	July 1941	March 1942	2nd time
Fernando María Castiella	November 1942	March 1943	
Antonio Riestra del Moral	15 March 1943	10 December 1945	Dissolution of the organisation

== See also ==
- Spain during World War II
- Falangism in Latin America
- Nazi Party/Foreign Organization
- Political international

== Bibliography ==
- Bowen, Wayne H. (2000). Spaniards and Nazi Germany: Collaboration in the New Order. University of Missouri Press.
- Bowen, Wayne H. (2006). Spain During World War II. University of Missouri Press.
- Chueca, Ricardo (1983). El fascismo en los comienzos del régimen de Franco: Un estudio sobre FET-JONS (in Spanish). Madrid: Centro de Investigaciones Sociológicas.
- del Arenal, Celestino (1994). Política exterior de España hacia Iberoamérica (in Spanish). Madrid: Editorial Complutense. ISBN 84-7491-516-3.
- Delgado Gómez-Escalonilla, Lorenzo (1988). Diplomacia franquista y política cultural hacia Iberoamérica, 1939-1953 (in Spanish). Madrid: Consejo Superior de Investigaciones Científicas. ISBN 84-00-06892-0.
- Delgado Gómez-Escalonilla, Lorenzo (2012). Imperio de papel: Acción cultural y política exterior durante el primer franquismo (in Spanish) (Consejo Superior de Investigaciones Científicas ed.). Madrid.
- Duarte, Ángel (2007). Canal i Morell, Jordi (ed.). Monárquicos y derechas (in Spanish). Madrid: Sílex. ISBN 978-84-7737-189-2.
- Gallego, Ferrán; Morente, Francisco (2005). Fascismo en España: ensayos sobre los orígenes sociales y culturales del franquismo (in Spanish). El Viejo Topo. ISBN 84-96356-32-9.
- González Calleja, Eduardo (1994). El servicio exterior de Falange y la política exterior del primer franquismo: consideraciones previas para su investigación (in Spanish) (54 ed.). Madrid: Consejo Superior de Investigaciones Científicas. pp. 279–301.
- Leonard, Thomas M.; Bratzel, John F. (2007). Latin America During World War II. Plymouth: Rowman & Littlefield.
- Massot i Muntaner, Josep (1996). El primer franquisme a Mallorca: guerra civil, repressió, exili i represa cultural (in Spanish). Publicacions de l'Abadia de Montserrat.
- Michonneau, Stéphane; Núñez Seixas, Xosé M. (2014). Imaginarios y representaciones de España durante el franquismo (in Spanish). Madrid: Casa de Velázquez. ISBN 9788415636656.
- Moreno Cantano, Antonio César (2006). Unidad de destino en lo universal. Falange y la propaganda exterior (1936-1945) (in Spanish) (24 ed.). Salamanca: Universidad de Salamanca. pp. 107–131.
- Naranjo Orovio, Consuelo (1988). Cuba, otro escenario de lucha: la guerra civil y el exilio republicano español (in Spanish). Madrid: Consejo Superior de Investigaciones Científicas.
- Payne, Stanley G. (1999). Fascism in Spain, 1923–1977 (in Spanish). Madison: University of Wisconsin Press.
- Polo Blanco, Antonio (2006). Gobierno de las poblaciones en el primer franquismo (1939–1945) (in Spanish). Universidad de Cádiz.
- Rodao, Florentino (1995). Spanish Falange in the Philippines, 1936–1945 (in Spanish) (43 ed.). Manila: Ateneo de Manila University. pp. 3–27.
- Rodríguez Puértolas, Julio (2008). Historia de la literatura fascista española (in Spanish) (1 ed.). Akal.
- Romero Samper, Milagrosa (2005). La oposición durante el franquismo 3. El exilio republicano (in Spanish). Madrid: Encuentro.
- Sánchez López, Rosario (2007). Entre la importancia y la irrelevancia. Sección Femenina: de la República a la Transición (in Spanish). Consejería de Educación y Cultura de Murcia.
- Sierra, Verónica (2009). Palabras huérfanas: Los niños y la Guerra Civil (in Spanish). Taurus.
- Steinberg, David J. (2000). The Philippines: A Singular and a Plural Place (in Spanish). Oxford: Westview Press.
- Vilaró, Ramon (2011). Sol naciente. Historias hispano-japonesas (in Spanish). RBA Libros. ISBN 9788490061398.
