= Luis A. Eguiguren =

Peruvian politician (1887–1967)

Luis A. Eguiguren Escudero
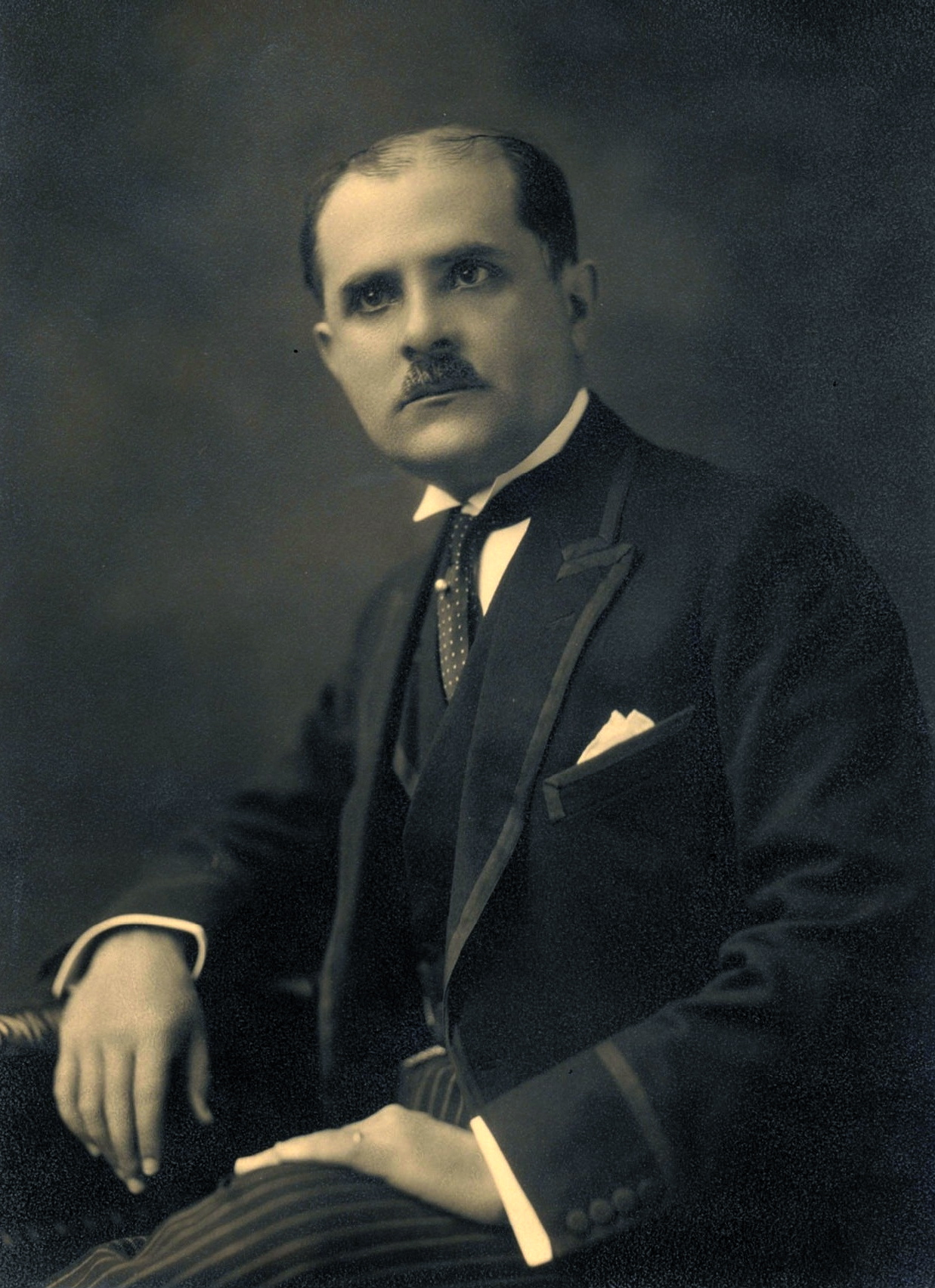

President of the Supreme Court of Justice
- In office 1953–1954
- Preceded by: Raúl Noriega
- Succeeded by: Raúl Pinto

President of the Constituent Congress
- In office July 28, 1931 – July 28, 1932
- Preceded by: Roberto Leguía (President of the Senate)
- Succeeded by: Clemente Revilla

Member of the Constituent Congress
- In office July 28, 1931 – July 28, 1932

Mayor of Lima
- In office January 1, 1930 – January 1, 1931

City Councilman of Lima
- In office January 1, 1914 – January 1, 1920

Personal details
- Born: July 21, 1887 Piura
- Died: August 15, 1967 (aged 80) Lima
- Party: Social Democrat Party
- Spouse: Rosa Barragán Rodríguez
- Children: Luis Jose Alejandro and Maria
- Parents: Francisco José Eguiguren Escudero (father); Josefina Escudero Menacho (mother)

Luis Antonio Eguiguren Escudero (July 21, 1887 – August 15, 1967) was a Peruvian educator, magistrate, historian and politician. He was the director of the General Archive (File) of the Nation (1914), Alderman of Lima (1914–1920), Mayor of Lima (1930), President of the Constituent Congress (1930–1932), founder and leader of the Peruvian Social Democratic Party. He won the Peruvian presidential election of 1936, but his victory was ignored by the Congress and the then-President Oscar R. Benavides, who claimed that he had won with votes of the APRA. He presided over the Supreme Court and the Judiciary in 1953 and 1954.

== Biography ==
Luis A. Eguiguren was born in the historical San Francisco Street (now Lima Street), in the city of Piura. He was the son of Francisco Jose Eguiguren Escudero, honest judge, congressman, Secretary of Justice and President of the Supreme Court in 1913 and 1914, and the distinguished lady Josefina Escudero Menacho. Between 1893 and 1902, he studied at Colegio San Miguel de Piura School and then at Colegio La Inmaculada(The Jesuit Fathers School) in Lima (1902–1904). He got into the Universidad Nacional Mayor de San Marcos, where he chose the academic degrees of Doctor of Letters (1913), in Jurisprudence with the thesis "The Peruvian ayllu legal status" (1914), and Political and Administrative Science (1914). His thesis of Bachelor of Political and Administrative Sciences was titled: "The Role of students in Political life", and his doctoral thesis: "The need for a diplomatic tradition in Peru". His remains were transferred to his native Piura in December 2005, in order to rest in the tomb that he ordered to be built in San Teodoro Cemetery. Law No. 24899, promulgated on October 19, 1988, establishes that each July 21 is the Peruvian Humanist Day. It was established in honor of the magistrate, historian, journalist and Peruvian politician, Don Luis Antonio Eguiguren, on the centenary of his birth.

== Career ==
He was appointed Director of the National Archive, but he resigned because he did not receive enough support to carry out the institution that was under his charge.

In the field of politics, he deployed an intense task. He was the Mayor of Lima in a short period of time, during the years of 1930 and 1931. He was elected deputy and later he presided over the Constituent Assembly. He was also president of the Supreme Court of the Republic.

In 1936 he ran for president in the Peruvian General Election as leader of the Social Democrat Party, after being convinced by the APRA to form his own party, to the detriment of Jorge Prado's Conservative Coalition. As the votes were being counted, Eguiguren appeared to be leading with a majority; the vote being finally suspended on October 21 (on the basis that members of the previously banned APRA party had voted for him) which left Eguiguren with 37.13% of the votes in comparison to Prado's 25.00%. However, due to the environment of political intolerance in Perú, the elections were nullified on the same arguments that the count was suspended: according to the government, American Popular Revolutionary Alliance support of his candidacy rendered his victory null (as he was supported by a party considered illegal for being an "international party").

After his frustrated presidency, he further developed a liking for historical research with dynamism and conviction, which perhaps explains the abundant and interesting bibliographical production of his authorship.

Eguiguren's work and research includes Orígenes de la Universidad de San Marcos, the history of his alma mater, San Marcos, the oldest American college.

Other of the books he also published were Catálogo histórico del claustro de la Universidad Nacional Mayor de San Marcos 1576–1800, La Universidad de San Marcos: IV centenario de la fundación de la Universidad Real y Pontificia y de su vigorosa continuidad histórica, y Diccionario cronológico de la Real y Pontificia Universidad de San Marcos y sus Colegios, vol I, vol.II and vol.III.

He is the most prolific San Marcos historian, because he has written six thousand pages of documents and texts about his university. He chaired the Committee appointed to draft the official history of San Marcos, on the occasion of its four hundred year anniversary in 1951. Luis A. Eguiguren was interested also on events and characters of Peru's Independence. Therefore, he published studies about La rebelión de León de Huánuco, Lima y Huamanga −1812, La revolución de 1814, El mártir pescador José Silverio Olaya, La sublevación de Túpac Amaru, among others.

He made an important contribution to the text Apuntes sobre la cuestión internacional entre Perú y Ecuador, in which he demonstrated that some Peru's northern territories, like Jaen and Maynas, undoubtedly belong to his country.

Luis A. Eguiguren is the only Peruvian to lead the three branches of government, the Constituent Congress (1930–1932), the Supreme Court (1953–1954) and the failed Presidency (1936).

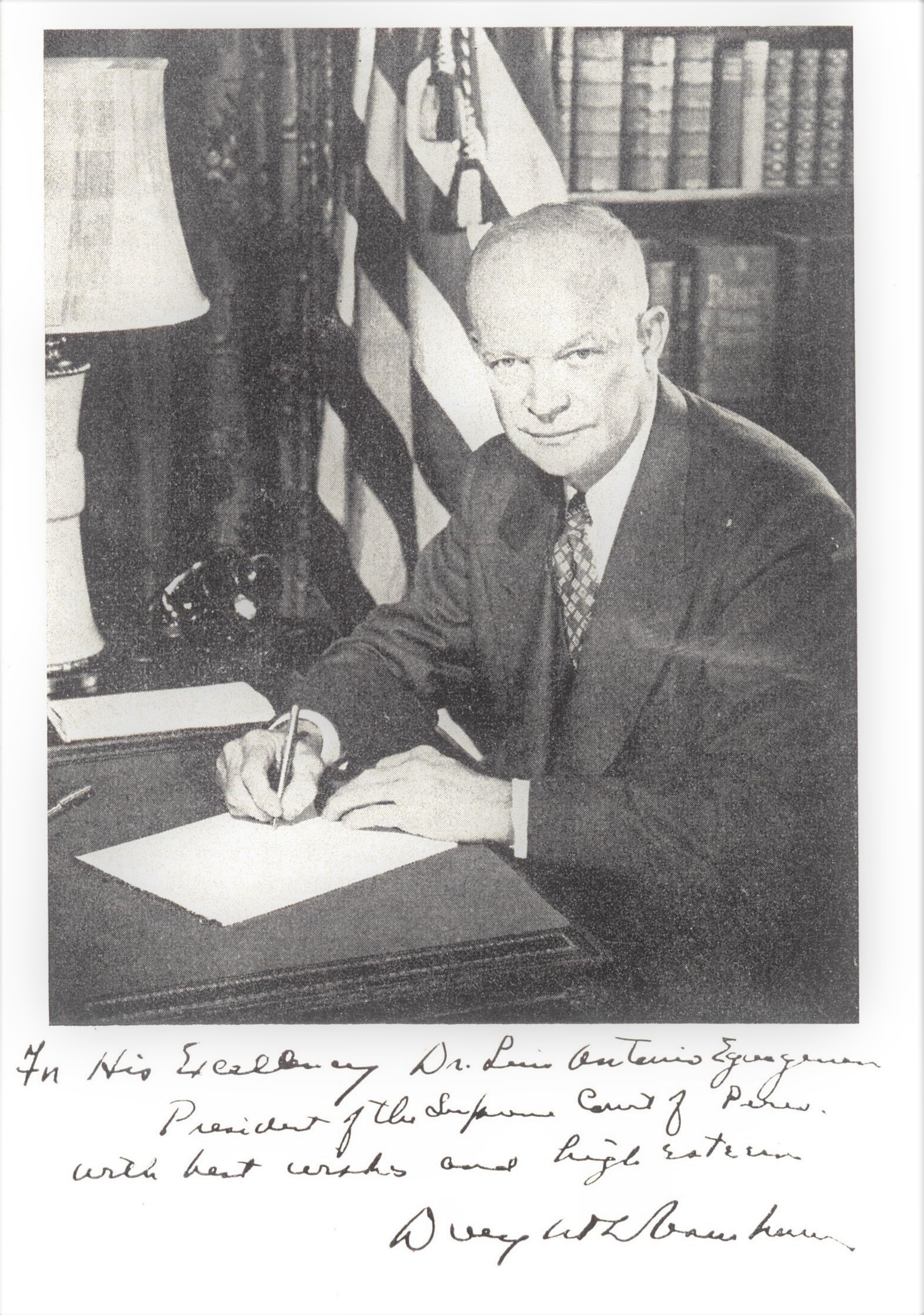
Photograph, with dedication, given by President Dwight Eisenhower to Luis A. Eguiguren, on the occasion of his visit to the United States as President of the Supreme Court of Peru in June 1954

== Political offices ==
- Secretario del Ministerio de Hacienda (1910–1911) during the first government (1908–1912) of Augusto B. Leguía.
- Concejal de la Municipalidad de Lima 1914–1920. City Councilman of Lima.
- Director del Archivo Nacional (1914). Director of the Peruvian National Archives
- Embajador Ad honorem ante el Vaticano (1924). Ad honorem Ambassador of Peru to the Vatican.
- Alcalde de Lima (1930–1931) Mayor of Lima
- Presidente del Congreso Constituyente (1931). President of the Constituent Congress
- Presidente electo del Perú (1936). Elected President of Peru
- Vocal de la Corte Suprema de Justicia (1946). Member of the Supreme Court
- Presidente de la Corte Suprema de Justicia (1952–1953). President of the Supreme Court
- Fundador del Diario y editorial "Ahora" (1934). Founder of the newspaper and editorial "Now (Ahora)”

== Honours ==
- Gran Cruz de la Orden del Sol del Perú.
- Orden de San Gregorio Magno. Holy See.
- Orden del Libertador. Venezuela

He was named Doctor Honoris Causa of the following universities:

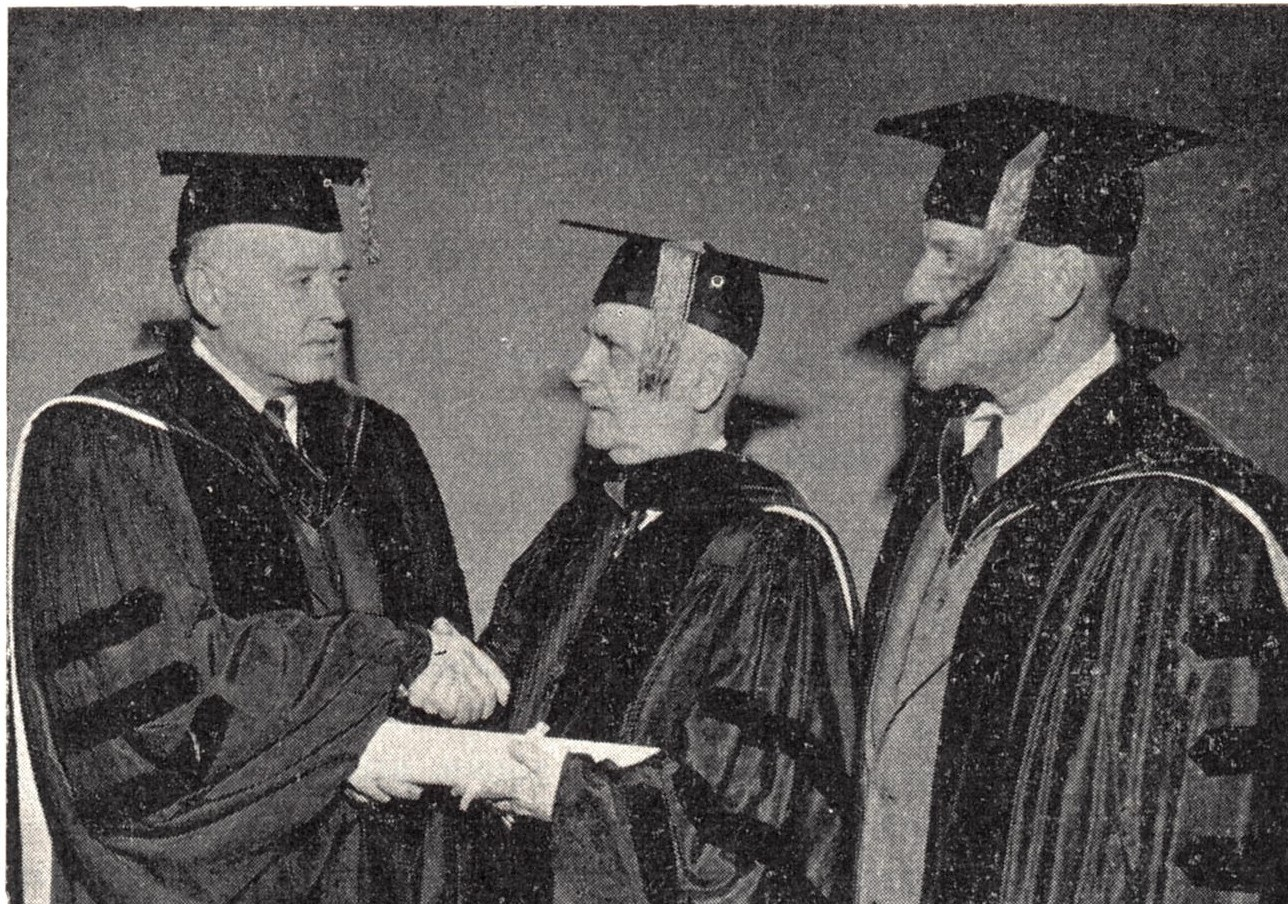
Luis A. Eguiguren (center) receiving the Doctor Honoris Causa Diploma from Columbia University in New York

- Columbia University. New York (1953)
- Georgetown University. Washington (1953)
- Pontificia Universidad Católica de Chile. Santiago (1932)

== Publications ==
- 1908 Los símbolos de la patria: trabajo histórico presentado en la actuación patriótica de la "Escuela Técnica de Comercio"
- 1909 Recordando a Manuel Candamo
- 1909 El Pensamiento de San Martín
- 1910 El fundador de la Universidad de San Marcos fray Tomás de San Martín
- 1911 Origen de la Universidad de San Marcos
- 1912 Actuación de los hijos de Chile en la Universidad de San Marcos (siglos XVI, XVII y XVIII)
- 1912 La Cátedra de Prima de Leyes
- 1912 Catálogo histórico del claustro de la Universidad de San Marcos
- 1912 Con la juventud de América
- 1912 La Rebelión de León de Huánuco
- 1913 Ensayo sobre el sistema penal incaico
- 1913 Historia del Batallón Numancia
- 1913 Tentativa de segunda rebelión de Huánuco, octubre de 1812-enero de 1813
- 1913 Reflexiones en torno del edicto de Milán
- 1914 El ayllu peruano y su condición legal (Doctoral Thesis in Jurisprudence UNMSM. Lima Peru)
- 1914 La tradición diplomática en el Perú
- 1914 La rebelión del Cuzco de 1814
- 1915 La anexión del distrito de Castilla a la ciudad de Piura
- 1915 Intervención de los estudiantes de la Universidades en la vida política
- 1915 La Holgazanería en el Perú
- 1921 Historia de la Universidad de San Marcos hasta el 15 de julio de 1647 por el Padre Maestro Fray Antonio de la Calancha
- 1931 Origen y legislación sobre los impuestos para desocupados
- 1933 En la Selva política
- 1935 La sedición de Huamanga en 1812: Ayacucho y la Independencia
- Actualidad política. Eguiguren, Haya de la Torre, Prado, Flores, Villarán, Pierola
- 1936 La vitalidad de la Democracia en el Perú
- 1939 El Usurpador
- 1939 Alma Mater. Orígenes de la Universidad de San Marcos 1551 – 1579
- 1940;1941; 1951 Diccionario histórico cronológico de la Real Universidad de San Marcos y sus colegios en tres tomos Tomo I, Tomo II y Tomo III)
- 1941 Apuntes sobre la cuestión internacional entre el Perú y Ecuador: Maynas
- 1942 El estudiante de medicina Daniel Carrión: proceso judicial sobre su gloriosa muerte
- 1942 Guerra separatista del Perú (1777–1780)
- 1943 Invencible Jaén (English)
- 1944 Santa Rosa de Lima
- 1944 La Creación de la Democracia de Post Guerra
- 1944 La restauración del derecho
- 1945 El mártir pescador José Silverio Olaya y los pupilos del Real Felipe
- 1945 La inconstitucionalidad de las leyes: Artículo XXII del título preliminar del Código Civil
- 1945 Carta de las Naciones Unidas y Estatutos de la Corte Internacional de la Haya
- 1945 La Democracia y la mutilación de la Constitución
- 1945 Leyendas y curiosidades de la historia nacional
- 1945 Fondo Monetario Internacional y Banco Internacional para la Reconstrucción
- 1945 Documentos de Dumbarton Oaks sobre Organización Internacional
- 1945 Organización Propósitos y Progreso de la UNRRA
- 1946 Sociología Sexual
- 1945–47 Las calles de Lima
- 1948 El abuso del Derecho
- 1949 El Archivo Nacional del Perú. Breve inventario de expedientes
- 1949 El paseo triunfal y el vejamen del graduando(1)
- 1949 Semblanza de la Universidad de San Marcos por Diego de León Pinelo (1648) (translator Latin-Spanish)
- 1950 Toribio Rodríguez de Mendoza
- 1950 Toward the country of democracy: Hacia el país de la democracia (English-Spanish)
- 1950 Universidad de San Marcos: IV centenario de la fundación de la Universidad Real y Pontificia y de su vigorosa continuidad histórica(1)
- 1950 La Universidad en el s. XVINarración (Volumen I)Las Constituciones de la Universidad y otros documentos (Volumen II)
- 1950 Historia de la medicina peruana.La medicina incaica (Volumen I) La medicina en el Virreinato (Volumen II)La medicina en la República (Volumen III) (Editor)
- 1950 Lugares Teológicos por Rodríguez de Mendoza (translator Latin-Spanish)
- 1952 Guerra separatista rebeliones de indios en Sur América la sublevación de Túpac Amaru, crónica de Melchor de Paz. Tomo I; Tomo II. Con apostillas a la obra de Melchor de Paz, por Luis Antonio Eguiguren.
- 1953 El proceso de Juan de Berindoaga y Palomares: un capítulo de Historia del Libertador Bolívar en el Perú
- 1954 Sánchez Carrión: Ministro General de los negocios del Perú. Tomo I; Tomo II
- 1954 Las instituciones civiles en el Perú
- 1955 Unanue, Arequipa y la Historia creadora
- 1956 Huellas de la Compañía de Jesús en el Perú
- 1956 Dr. Fernando Máximo López Aldana, prócer de la independencia del Perú, vocal de la Corte Suprema de Justicia de la República
- 1957 Guerra separatista: la tentativa de rebelión que concibió el Doctor José Mateo Silva en Lima
- 1959 Apellidos y fisonomía moral de Pumacahua
- 1958 Carta de las Naciones Unidas y Estatutos de la Corte Internacional de Justicia
- 1959 Hojas para la Historia de la Emancipación del Perú Tomo I
- 1961 Hojas para la Historia de la Emancipación del Perú Tomo II
- 1964 El Derecho del Perú Virreinal: Crisis del derecho y justicia
- 1966 Lima inexpugnable: Un libro desconocido del polígrafo don Pedro Peralta y Barnuevo
- 1967 Hojas para la Historia de la Emancipación del Perú Tomo III
- 1967 El recurso de Habeas Corpus
- 1967 Trozos de vida

== Sources ==
- CORREA, Y. – EGUIGUREN, L. D. Luis Antonio Eguiguren Escudero https://web.archive.org/web/20100914003142/http://www.udep.edu.pe/publicaciones/desdelcampus/art1763.html
- ESTRADA MORALES, J. Luis A. Eguiguren: humanista y polígrafo piurano, Lima : Imprenta Huiman, [2000]
- MUSEO DEL CONGRESO (República del Perú) http://www.congreso.gob.pe/museo/presidentes/226.LA-Eguiguren-1931.pdf
- UNIVERSIDAD NACIONAL MAYOR DE SAN MARCOS (Lima-Perú) Personajes distinguidos http://www.unmsm.edu.pe/sanmarcos/biografia/eguigurenl.htm
- TAURO DEL PINO, Alberto, Enciclopedia Ilustrada del Perú. Lima, PEISA, 2001. ISBN 978-9972-40-166-4

Preceded by Luis Albizuri	Mayor of Lima; 1930–1931	Succeeded by José Manuel García Bedoya
