= Ana María Baiardi =

Paraguayan diplomat and politician

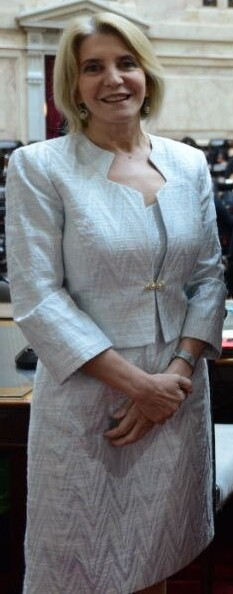

Ana María Baiardi Quesnel (born Asunción, Paraguay; 17 July 1965) is a Paraguayan diplomat and politician. From 2018 to 2022, she served as the ambassador of Paraguay in Peru.

== Biography ==
Baiardi studied Systems Analysis at the Universidad Católica Nuestra Señora de la Asunción; afterwards she specialized in Social Science at the Long Island University, New York, and she obtained a Master in International Integration from the University of Perugia, Italy.

From 2008 to 15 August 2013 she was Paraguayan ambassador to Italy, Israel, Greece and Slovenia.

On 15 August 2013 she was sworn in as Minister for Women of Paraguay in the cabinet of President Horacio Cartes.
