= List of ambassadors of Peru to Paraguay =

Ambassador of Peru to the Republic of Paraguay
- Great Seal of Peru
- Ministry of Foreign Affairs
- Appointer: The president of Peru
- Inaugural holder: Buenaventura Seoane
- Formation: 1861
- Website: Embassy of Peru in Paraguay

The extraordinary and plenipotentiary ambassador of Peru to the Republic of Paraguay is the official representative of the Republic of Peru to the Republic of Paraguay.

Both countries established relations on November 13, 1858, which have continued since. During the Paraguayan War, the Peruvian Minister of Foreign Affairs, José Toribio Pacheco, made a statement defending the country in 1866.

== List of representatives ==
Name	Portrait	Term begin	Term end	President	Notes
Buenaventura Seoane		1861	1862	Ramón Castilla	Resident Minister in Brazil to Argentina, Uruguay and Paraguay.
Benigno González Vigil		1865	1868	Mariano Ignacio Prado	Charge d'affaires.
Buenaventura Seoane		1862	1862	Ramón Castilla	Resident Minister in the Republic of Uruguay, the Empire of Brazil and Paraguay
Evaristo Gómez Sánchez y Benavides		1880	1882	Nicolás de Piérola	Envoy Extraordinary and Minister Plenipotentiary to Argentina, Brazil, Paraguay and Uruguay
Juan Luna		1885	1885	Miguel Iglesias	Envoy Extraordinary and Minister Plenipotentiary to Argentina, Brazil, Paraguay and Uruguay.
Cesáreo Chacaltana Reyes		1888	1888	Andrés Avelino Cáceres	Diplomatic mission to Argentina, Brazil, Paraguay and Uruguay
Carlos Rey de Castro		before 1929	after 1929	Augusto B. Leguía	As Envoy Extraordinary and Minister Plenipotentiary.
José Ortiz de Zevallos		1933	1936	Óscar R. Benavides	As ambassador.
Oscar Barrenechea y Raygada		before 1946	after 1946	Manuel Prado Ugarteche	
César Élejalde Chopitea		before 1954	after 1957	Manuel A. Odría	
Luis A. Flores		April 23, 1957	1962	Manuel Prado Ugarteche	Ambassador to Nicaragua since the year prior.
José Luis Espinosa-Saldaña Astorga		1974	August 1983	Juan Velasco Alvarado	As ambassador.
Alejandro León Pazos		1994	1998	Alberto Fujimori	As ambassador.
Norah Nalvarte Chávez		1998	2003	Alberto Fujimori	As ambassador.
Enrique Alejandro Palacio Reyes		2006?	January 22, 2009	Alan García	As ambassador.
Jorge Antonio Lázaro Geldres		2009	2014	Alan García	As ambassador.
María Cecilia Rozas Ponce de León		January 30, 2015	2017	Ollanta Humala	As ambassador.
José Eduardo Chávarri García		June 15, 2017	2019	Pedro Pablo Kuczynski	As ambassador.
María Milagros Castañón Seoane		March 14, 2020	August 31, 2023	Martín Vizcarra	As ambassador.
María Antonia Masana García		April 2, 2024	2026	Dina Boluarte	
