= Ministry of Women (Paraguay) =

Paraguay's ministry

The Ministry of Women or Ministry of Women's Affairs (MWA) is a Paraguayan state ministry established in 2012. The current Minister of Women is Celina Esther Lezcano, who succeeded Nilda Romero in March 2021.

== History of the ministry ==
In 1993 the Paraguayan state created a Secretariat for Women's Affairs within the Office of the President. This secretariat was raised to the status of a Ministry of Women's Affairs by Act No. 4675, in 2012.

In 2013 the Ministry took action to address high rates of domestic violence, promoting a national 24-hour telephone hotline for victims and operating a shelter in Asunción for female victims of sex trafficking or domestic violence. The Ministry is participating in the National Commission on Climate Change, which is preparing a National Gender Strategy on Climate Change to advance women's rights in relation to the environment. In 2018 Presidential Decree no. 936 established a National Equality Plan, setting out 2018-2024 plans for the Ministry of Women to work towards gender equality in partnership with UN Women.

== List of ministers ==
=== Secretaries for women's affairs (1993–2013) ===
- Cristina Muñoz (1993–??)
- Nilda Cabrera (1997–1998)
- Haydee Carnagnola de Aquino (1998–1999)
- María José Argaña de Mateu (2003–2008)
- Gloria Rubin (2008–2013)

=== Ministers of women (2013 to present) ===
- Ana María Baiardi (14 August 2013 – 15 August 2018)
- Nilda Romero (15 August 2018 – 6 March 2021)
- Celina Esther Lezcano (9 March 2021 – present)
