= María José Argaña Mateu =

Paraguayan politician, businesswoman and diplomat (born 1961)

María José Argaña de Mateu (born 1961) is a Paraguayan politician, businesswoman and diplomat. From 2003 to 2008, she was Minister of Paraguay's Secretariat for Women's Affairs. In 2017 she was appointed Paraguay's Ambassador to Portugal.

== Life ==
Mateu was born in Asunción on May 19, 1961, the daughter of Col. José María Argaña and María Auxiliadora Guanes de Argaña. She joined the Colorado Party at the age of 17. She received a scholarship to study business administration at the University of Tulane in New Orleans, and worked in a bank for 17 years.

From 1999 to 2000, she was Director of International Relations for the Secretariat for Women's Affairs. From 2003 to 2008 she was Minister of the Secretariat for Women. A businesswoman, she owns a gymnasium called Pulsations.

In November 2017, she was appointed the Paraguayan Ambassador to Portugal.
