= Luis A. Flores =

Peruvian politician (1899–1969)

Luis Alberto Flores Medina
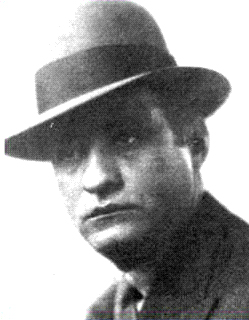

Supreme Chief of the Revolutionary Union
- In office April 30, 1933 – 1960
- Preceded by: Luis Miguel Sánchez Cerro

Prime Minister of Peru
- In office April 13, 1932 – May 20, 1932
- Prime Minister: Luis Miguel Sánchez Cerro
- Preceded by: Francisco Lanatta
- Succeeded by: Ricardo Rivadeneira

Minister of Government and Police
- In office January 28, 1932 – May 20, 1932
- Preceded by: José Manuel García
- Succeeded by: Julio Chávez

Minister of Navy and Aviation
- In office May 3, 1933 – June 26, 1933
- Preceded by: Alfredo Benavides
- Succeeded by: Carlos Rotalde

Deputy of the Constituent Congress
- In office December 8, 1931 – December 8, 1936
- Preceded by: Luis Miguel Sánchez Cerro
- Succeeded by: Position abolished

Senator of Piura
- In office 1947–1948

Ambassador of Peru to Italy
- In office 1948–1950
- Preceded by: Ricardo Rivera Schreiber
- Succeeded by: José Félix Aramburú

Ambassador of Peru to Nicaragua and Paraguay
- In office 1956–1962

Personal details
- Born: October 11, 1899 Ayabaca, Peru
- Died: May 28, 1969 (aged 69) Lima, Peru
- Party: Revolutionary Union
- Education: National University of San Marcos

Luis Alberto Flores Medina (Ayabaca, October 11, 1899 — Lima, May 28, 1969) was a Peruvian lawyer, politician and diplomat. He was the Supreme Chief of the Revolutionary Union, a fascist party modelled after its Italian counterpart, after the assassination of the party's founder, Luis Miguel Sánchez Cerro. He also served as a deputy for Lima and as Senator for Piura and Minister of Navy and Aviation, Government and Police and President of the Council of Ministers of Peru.

== Early life ==
Flores was born in Ayabaca, Piura, on October 11, 1899. He grew up in a neighbourhood popular for its cuisine known as "La Mangachería", and took part in right-wing academic circles growing up.

== Political career ==
Flores was part of Luis Miguel Sánchez Cerro's cabinet, as well as an urrista, i.e. a member of his political party, Revolutionary Union. Under Sánchez Cerro, Flores served as Prime Minister, and Minister of Government and Police (1932), as well as Minister of Navy and Aviation (1933) and member of Congress (1931–1936). After Sánchez Cerro's assassination, he took over his political party and modelled it after Italian fascism.

After the annulment of the 1936 Peruvian general election, Flores and his party reportedly planned a coup d'état which was discovered, leading to his exile in Chile, where he supported himself using the funds he gained from his hacienda in Cajamarca.

== Later life ==
Flores returned to Peru in the early 1940s and reorganized his political party, which never achieved the same results it reached in 1936.

He later served as deputy for his native Piura, as well as ambassador of Peru in Italy and Paraguay, where he made comments in support of the Hispanidad.

He died in Lima on May 28, 1969.
