= Superwarfarin =

Superwarfarins are highly potent vitamin K antagonist anticoagulants that are used as rodenticides. They are called superwarfarins because they are much more potent and long acting than warfarin.

== Examples ==
- Brodifacoum
- Bromadiolone
- Difenacoum
- Flocoumafen
