= 4-Hydroxycoumarins =

Group of anticoagulant drugs

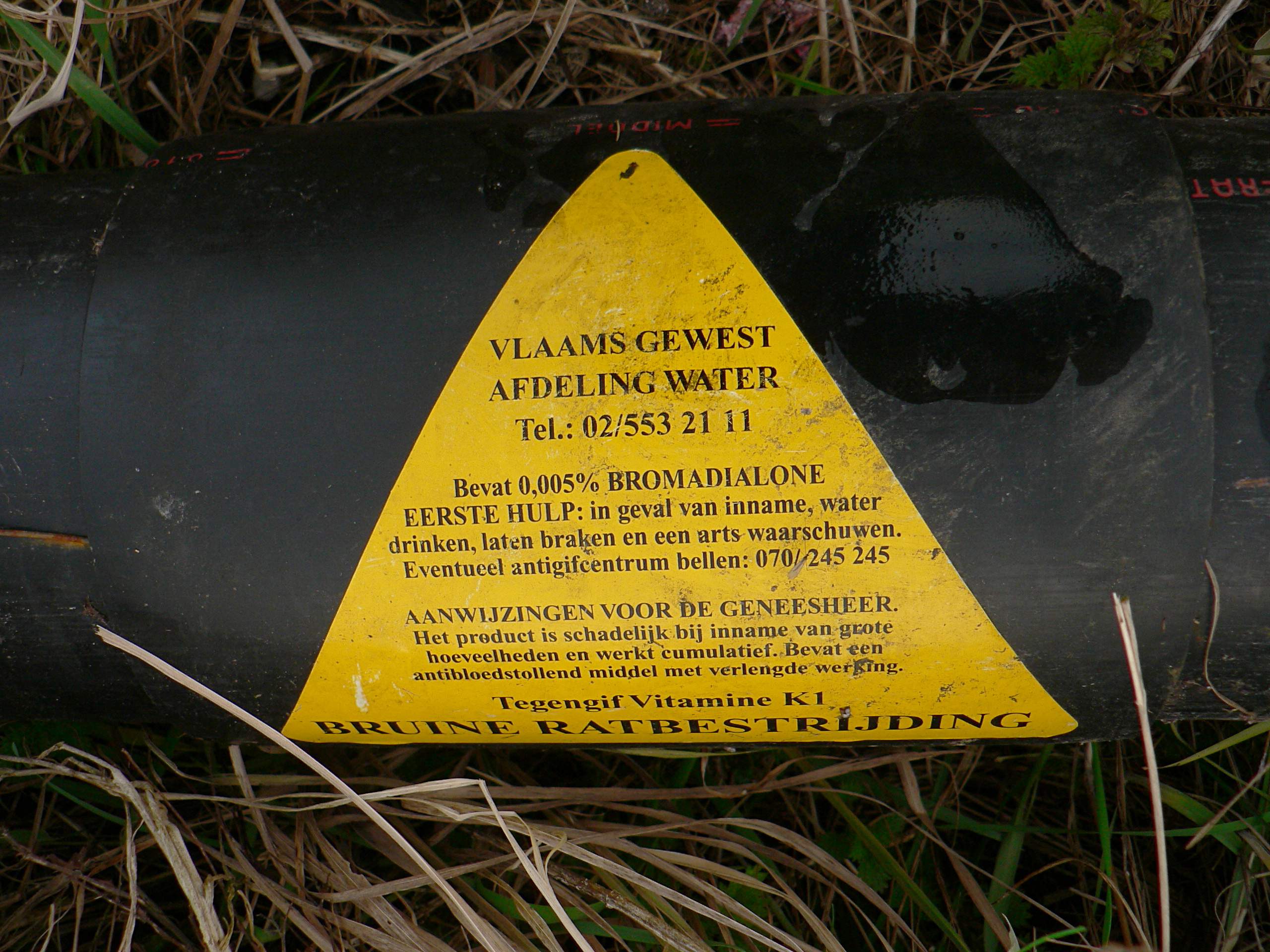
Warning label on a tube of "brown rat" poison laid on a dike of the Scheldt river in Steendorp, Belgium. The tube contains bromadiolone, a second-generation ("super-warfarin") anticoagulant. The label in Dutch states, in part: Contains an anticoagulant with prolonged activity. Antidote Vitamin K1.

4-Hydroxycoumarins are a class of vitamin K antagonist (VKA) anticoagulant drug molecules. Chemically, they are derived from coumarin by adding a hydroxy group at the 4 position to obtain 4-hydroxycoumarin, then adding a large aromatic substituent at the 3-position (the ring-carbon between the hydroxyl and the carbonyl). The large 3-position substituent is required for anticoagulant activity.

The primary mechanism of the 4-hydroxycoumarin drugs is the inhibition of vitamin K epoxide reductase. These compounds are not direct antagonists (in the pharmaceutical sense) of vitamin K, but rather act to deplete reduced vitamin K in tissues. For this reason vitamin K antagonizes their effect, and this has led to the loose terminology of "vitamin K antagonist".

== Origin ==
Although 4-hydroxycoumarin itself is not an anticoagulant, it is an important fungal metabolite from the precursor coumarin, which is also not an anticoagulant, and its production leads to further fermentative production of the natural anticoagulant dicoumarol. This happens in the presence of naturally occurring formaldehyde, which allows attachment of a second 4-hydroxycoumarin molecule through the linking carbon of the formaldehyde, to the 3-position of the first 4-hydroxycoumarin molecule, giving the semi-dimer the motif of the drug class. Dicoumarol appears in spoiled silage of sweet clover and is considered a natural mycotoxin substance of combined plant and fungal origin. The identification of dicoumarol in 1940 was the precursor to development of the 4-hydroxycoumarin class of drugs.

== Effects ==
The synthetic drugs in the 4-hydroxycoumarin class are all noted primarily for their use as anticoagulants, though they can have several additional effects. All affect the normal metabolism of vitamin K in the body by inhibiting the enzyme vitamin K epoxide reductase which recycles vitamin K to active form. As such, these compounds form the most important and widely used subset of vitamin K antagonist drugs, but other such drugs exist which do not have the 4-hydroxycoumarin structure. All the vitamin K antagonist agents diminish the amount of available vitamin K in the body, and thus inhibit the action of vitamin K-dependent enzymes that are critically involved in the production of active forms of certain clotting factors, and certain other metabolic processes involving the binding of calcium ion.

Mechanism of action for K1-vitamin.

== Drugs and poisons in the class ==
The simplest synthetic molecule in the 4-hydroxycoumarin class is warfarin, in which the aromatic 3-position substituent is a simple phenyl group. So called "super-warfarins" or second-generation anticoagulants in this class, were developed as rodenticides for rodents that have developed warfarin resistance. The second generation agents have even larger lipid-soluble substituents at the 3-position (e.g. brodifacoum), a chemical change that causes their half-lives in the body to be greatly increased (sometimes to months). The rodenticide chemicals are sometimes incorrectly referred to as "coumadins" rather than 4-hydroxycoumarins ("Coumadin" is a brand name for warfarin). They are also referred to as "coumarins," in reference to their derivation, although this term also may be deceptive since coumarin itself, as noted, is not active in clotting, and is used mostly as a perfumery agent.

Pharmaceutical examples of 4-hydroxycoumarin pharmaceuticals include:

- acenocoumarol
- dicoumarol
- ethyl biscoumacetate
- phenprocoumon
- warfarin

Compounds in this class have also been used as pesticides, specifically rodenticides. They act by causing the affected animal to hemorrhage, causing it to seek water, and thus leave dwellings to die outdoors.

The second-generation vitamin K antagonist agents, used only in this fashion as poisons (because their duration of action is too long to be used as pharmaceuticals) include:

- coumatetralyl
- difenacoum
- flocoumafen
- bromadiolone
- tioclomarol
- brodifacoum ("d-CON" etc.)

== Structures ==
Coumarin; This molecule does not affect coagulation	4-Hydroxycoumarin; This molecule does not affect coagulation, but is a known carcinogen in diesel fumes and tobacco smoke; in the latter, it probably derives from combustion of the tobacco additive coumarin.	Dicumarol; This molecule was the first discovered 4-hydroxycoumarin anticoagulant. It is a dimer type structure connected at the 3 ring position.
Phenprocoumon (anticoagulant)	Warfarin; Most commonly used anticoagulant pharmaceutical	Acenocoumarol (anticoagulant)
Tecarfarin (experimental anticoagulant)

Brodifacoum; This molecule is a second-generation anticoagulant with a large 3-position substituent which causes it to be retained in fatty tissues for longer times than first-generation compounds and pharmaceuticals. (rodenticide)	Bromadiolone (rodenticide)
Coumatetralyl (rodenticide)	Difenacoum (rodenticide)
Flocoumafen (rodenticide)

== See also ==
- Vitamin K antagonist
