= C18H16O3 =

The molecular formula C_{18}H_{16}O_{3} (molar mass: 280.31 g/mol, exact mass: 280.1099 u) may refer to:

- Ipriflavone
- Phenprocoumon
