= Thiocoumarins =

- Thiocoumarin (thiochromen-2-one)

- 2-Thioxocoumarin (2H-1-benzopyran-2-thione)

- Dithiocoumarin (2H-1-benzothiopyran-2-thione)

Identifiers
CAS Number	Thiochromen-2-one: 1075-14-5; 2H-1-Benzopyran-2-thione: 3986-98-9; 2H-1-benzothiopyran-2-thione: 2054-33-3
3D model (JSmol)	Thiochromen-2-one: Interactive image; 2H-1-Benzopyran-2-thione: Interactive image; 2H-1-benzothiopyran-2-thione: Interactive image
ChEMBL	Thiochromen-2-one: ChEMBL3760092; 2H-1-Benzopyran-2-thione: ChEMBL3759409; 2H-1-benzothiopyran-2-thione: ChEMBL3759932
ChemSpider	Thiochromen-2-one: 9129055; 2H-1-Benzopyran-2-thione: 18736; 2H-1-benzothiopyran-2-thione: 555973
PubChem CID	Thiochromen-2-one: 10953838; 2H-1-Benzopyran-2-thione: 19890; 2H-1-benzothiopyran-2-thione: 640625
CompTox Dashboard (EPA)	Thiochromen-2-one: DTXSID90449545; 2H-1-Benzopyran-2-thione: DTXSID20192911; 2H-1-benzothiopyran-2-thione: DTXSID30348780
- InChI: Thiochromen-2-one: InChI=1S/C9H6OS/c10-9-6-5-7-3-1-2-4-8(7)11-9/h1-6H Key: MDYPJPPXVOPUNX-UHFFFAOYSA-N; 2H-1-Benzopyran-2-thione: InChI=1S/C9H6OS/c11-9-6-5-7-3-1-2-4-8(7)10-9/h1-6H Key: FRZDLTCXOSFHJC-UHFFFAOYSA-N; 2H-1-benzothiopyran-2-thione: InChI=1S/C9H6S2/c10-9-6-5-7-3-1-2-4-8(7)11-9/h1-6H Key: ZOVFLKOKOZVLQC-UHFFFAOYSA-N
- SMILES: Thiochromen-2-one: C1=CC=C2C(=C1)C=CC(=O)S2; 2H-1-Benzopyran-2-thione: C1=CC=C2C(=C1)C=CC(=S)O2; 2H-1-benzothiopyran-2-thione: C1=CC=C2C(=C1)C=CC(=S)S2
- Except where otherwise noted, data are given for materials in their standard state (at 25 °C [77 °F], 100 kPa). Infobox references

Thiocoumarins are a class of coumarins where one or both of the oxygen atoms are replaced by sulfur.
