= Des-gamma carboxyprothrombin =

Tumor marker of hepatocellular carcinoma

Des-gamma carboxyprothrombin (DCP), also known as protein induced by vitamin K absence/antagonist-II (PIVKA-II), is an abnormal form of the coagulation protein, prothrombin. Normally, the prothrombin precursor undergoes post-translational carboxylation (addition of a carboxylic acid group) by gamma-glutamyl carboxylase in the liver prior to secretion into plasma. DCP/PIVKA-II may be detected in people with deficiency of vitamin K (due to poor nutrition or malabsorption) and in those taking warfarin or other medication that inhibits the action of vitamin K.

== Diagnostic use ==
=== Hepatocellular carcinoma ===
A 1984 study first described the use of DCP as a marker of hepatocellular carcinoma (HCC); it was present in 91% of HCC patients, while not being detectable in other liver diseases. The DCP level did not change with the administration of vitamin K, suggesting a defect in gamma-carboxylation activity rather than vitamin K deficiency. A number of subsequent studies have since confirmed this phenomenon.

A 2007 comparison of various HCC tumor markers found DCP the least sensitive to risk factors for HCC (such as cirrhosis), and hence the most useful in predicting HCC. It differentiates HCC from non-malignant liver diseases. Moreover, it has been demonstrated that a combined analysis of DCP and Alpha-fetoprotein (AFP) can lead to a better prediction in early stages of HCC.

Despite many years of use in Japan, only did a 2003 American study reevaluate its use in an American patient series. It also identified HCC at an earlier stage.

=== Anticoagulant intoxication ===
A 1987 report described the use of DCP determination in the detection of intoxication with acenocoumarol, a vitamin K antagonist.
