= Tioclomarol =

Chemical compound

Clinical data
- ATC code: B01AA11 (WHO)

Identifiers
- IUPAC name: 3-[3-(4-Chlorophenyl)-1-(5-chloro-2-thienyl)-3-hydroxypropyl]-2-hydroxy-4H-chromen-4-one
- CAS Number: 22619-35-8
- PubChem CID: 72147
- ChemSpider: 11236578
- UNII: E5B7C16LFK
- KEGG: D07137
- ChEMBL: ChEMBL2105401
- CompTox Dashboard (EPA): DTXSID80875354

Chemical and physical data
- Formula: C_{22}H_{16}Cl_{2}O_{4}S
- Molar mass: 447.33 g·mol^{−1}
- 3D model (JSmol): Interactive image
- SMILES: c1ccc2c(c1)c(c(c(=O)o2)C(CC(c3ccc(cc3)Cl)O)c4ccc(s4)Cl)O
- InChI: InChI=1S/C22H16Cl2O4S/c23-13-7-5-12(6-8-13)16(25)11-15(18-9-10-19(24)29-18)20-21(26)14-3-1-2-4-17(14)28-22(20)27/h1-10,15-16,25-26H,11H2; Key:WRGOVNKNTPWHLZ-UHFFFAOYSA-N

Tioclomarol is an anticoagulant of the 4-hydroxycoumarin vitamin K antagonist type. It is a second generation drug, used as a rodenticide that is effective for the control of rodents that are resistant to this class of drugs.
