= Bromadiolone =

Names
- IUPAC name 3-[3-[4-(4-Bromophenyl)phenyl]-3-hydroxy-1-phenylpropyl]-2-hydroxychromen-4-one
- Other names Broprodifacoum; Bromatrol

Identifiers
| CAS Number | 28772-56-7 |
| 3D model (JSmol) | Interactive image |
| ChEMBL | ChEMBL1165553 |
| ChemSpider | 10606098 |
| ECHA InfoCard | 100.044.718 |
| KEGG | C18596 |
| PubChem CID | 34322 |
| UNII | J2FR050NM5 |
| CompTox Dashboard (EPA) | DTXSID9032589 |
- InChI: InChI=1/C30H23BrO4/c31-23-16-14-20(15-17-23)19-10-12-22(13-11-19)26(32)18-25(21-6-2-1-3-7-21)28-29(33)24-8-4-5-9-27(24)35-30(28)34/h1-17,25-26,32-33H,18H2 Key: OWNRRUFOJXFKCU-UHFFFAOYSA-N
- SMILES: Brc1ccc(cc1)c2ccc(cc2)C(O)CC(C\3=C(/O)c4ccccc4OC/3=O)c5ccccc5

Properties
| Chemical formula | C_{30}H_{23}BrO_{4} |
| Molar mass | 527.414 g·mol^{−1} |

Hazards
- Occupational safety and health (OHS/OSH)
| Main hazards | |

| NFPA 704 (fire diamond) | 4 1 0 |
- Except where otherwise noted, data are given for materials in their standard state (at 25 °C [77 °F], 100 kPa). Infobox references

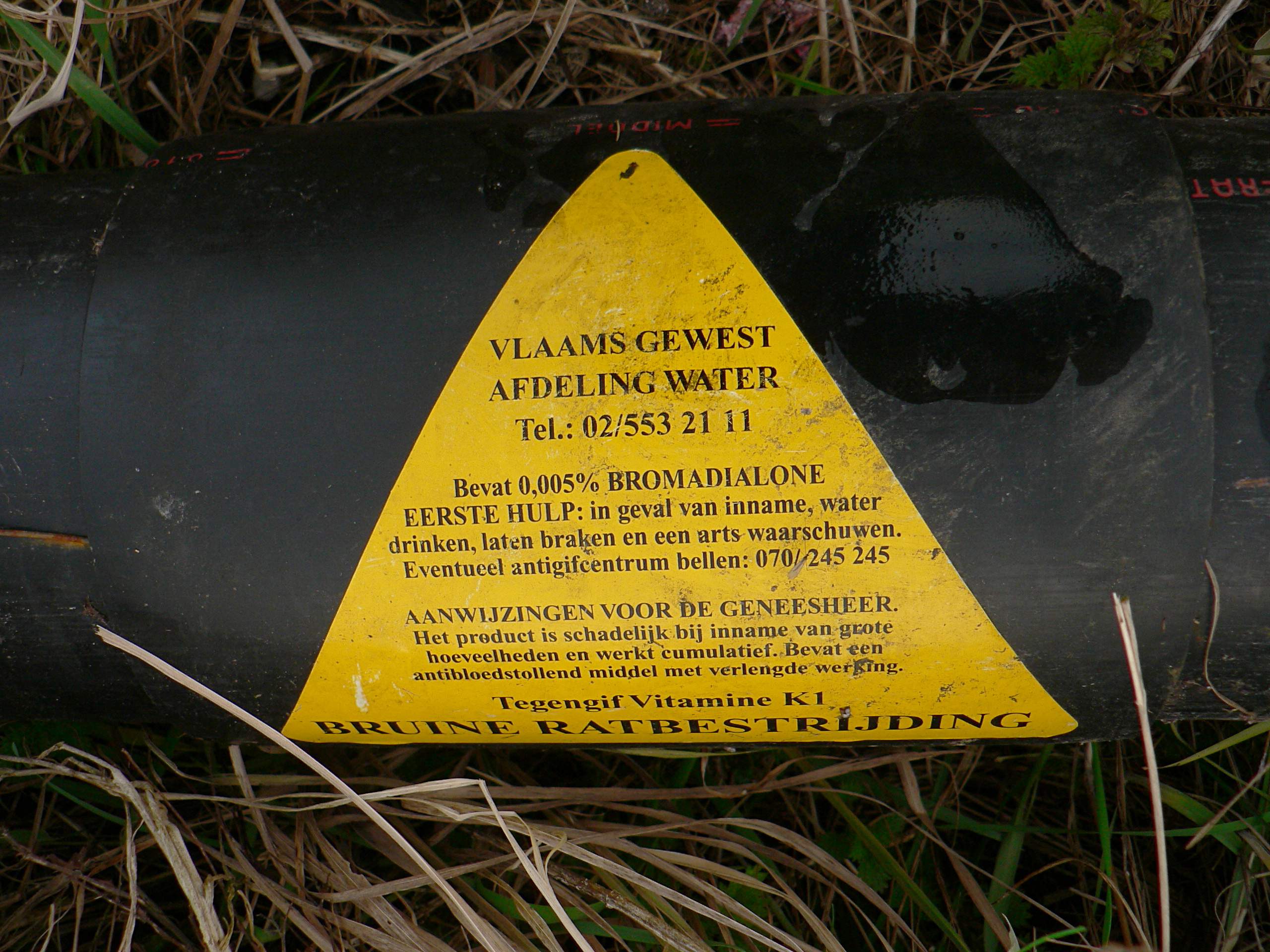
Warning label on a tube of rat poison containing bromadiolone on a dike of the Scheldt river in Steendorp, Belgium

Bromadiolone is a potent anticoagulant rodenticide. It is a second-generation 4-hydroxycoumarin derivative and vitamin K antagonist, often called a "super-warfarin" for its added potency and tendency to accumulate in the liver of the poisoned organism. When first introduced to the UK market in 1980, it was effective against rodent populations that had become resistant to first-generation anticoagulants.

The product may be used both indoors and outdoors for rats and mice.

It is classified as an extremely hazardous substance in the United States as defined in Section 302 of the Emergency Planning and Community Right-to-Know Act (42 U.S.C. 11002), and is subject to strict reporting requirements by facilities which produce, store, or use it in significant quantities.

== Toxicity ==
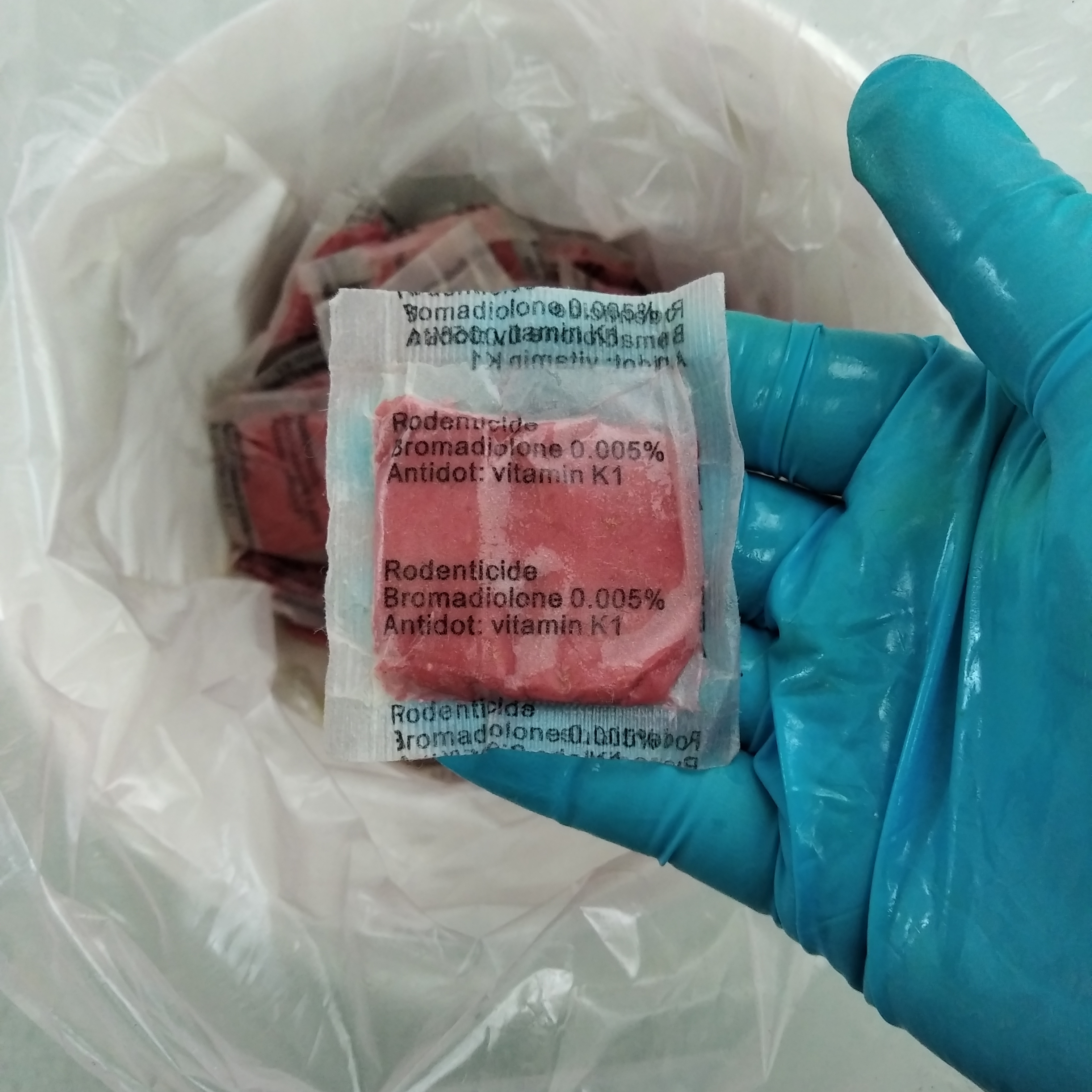
Paste contains bromadiolone (0.005%)

Bromadiolone can be absorbed through the digestive tract, through the lungs, or through skin contact. The pesticide is generally given orally. The substance is a vitamin K antagonist. A lack of vitamin K in the circulatory system reduces blood clotting and will cause death due to internal hemorrhaging.

Poisoning does not show effects for 24 to 36 hours after it is eaten and can take up to 2–5 days to cause death.

Following are acute LD_{50} values for various animals (mammals):

- rats 1.125 mg/kg b.w.
- mice 1.75 mg/kg b.w.
- rabbits 1 mg/kg b.w.
- dogs > 10 mg/kg b.w. (oral MTD)
- cats > 25 mg/kg b.w. (oral MTD)

== Chemistry ==
The compound is used as a mixture of four stereoisomers. Its two stereoisomeric centers are at the phenyl- and the hydroxyl-substituted carbons in the carbon chain of the substituent at the 3 position of the coumarin.

Bromadiolone
(1R,3S)-isomer
(1S,3R)-isomer
(1R,3R)-isomer
(1S,3S)-isomer

== Antidote ==
Vitamin K1 is used as an antidote to bromadiolone.

== See also ==
- Brodifacoum
