= Tecarfarin =

Chemical compound

Clinical data
- Other names: ATI-5923
- Routes of administration: By mouth
- ATC code: None

Legal status
- Legal status: Investigational

Pharmacokinetic data
- Elimination half-life: 87–136 hours

Identifiers
- IUPAC name: 1,1,1,3,3,3-Hexafluoro-2-methyl-2-propanyl 4-[(4-hydroxy-2-oxo-2H-chromen-3-yl)methyl]benzoate
- CAS Number: 867257-26-9
- PubChem CID: 54718618
- ChemSpider: 26467760
- UNII: WN1479YT50
- KEGG: D09676
- ChEMBL: ChEMBL2105664
- CompTox Dashboard (EPA): DTXSID90235788

Chemical and physical data
- Formula: C_{21}H_{14}F_{6}O_{5}
- Molar mass: 460.328 g·mol^{−1}
- 3D model (JSmol): Interactive image
- SMILES: CC(C(F)(F)F)(C(F)(F)F)OC(=O)c1ccc(cc1)Cc2c(c3ccccc3oc2=O)O
- InChI: InChI=1S/C21H14F6O5/c1-19(20(22,23)24,21(25,26)27)32-17(29)12-8-6-11(7-9-12)10-14-16(28)13-4-2-3-5-15(13)31-18(14)30/h2-9,28H,10H2,1H3; Key:QFLNTQDOVCLQKW-UHFFFAOYSA-N

Tecarfarin is a vitamin K antagonist under development for use as an anticoagulant. A Phase II/III clinical trial in 607 people, comparing it to the established vitamin K antagonist warfarin, found no difference in quality of anticoagulation or side effects between the two drugs in the overall population. Among patients taking CYP2C9 interacting drugs however, the tecarfarin patients’ TTR was 72.2% (n=92) vs 69.9% (n=87) for warfarin patients (pint=0.16); among patients who had both a CYP2C9 variant allele and taking a CYP2C9 interacting drug, TTR was 76.5% and 69.5% for the tecarfarin (n=24) and warfarin (n=31) groups, respectively (pint=0.24). This study included in 84 (14%) patients with a mechanical heart valve as an indication for anticoagulation therapy. No thrombotic or embolic events were observed in the tecarfarin treated subjects. In contrast to warfarin, tecarfarin is not affected by the cytochrome P450 inhibiting drug fluconazole, indicating a lower potential for interactions with other drugs.

A randomized, pharmacokinetic study in which healthy volunteer subjects and patients with severe chronic kidney disease received single-dose warfarin or tecarfarin in a crossover design was performed. This showed that mean plasma concentrations of (S)-warfarin and (R,S)-warfarin were higher (44 and 27%, respectively) in the subjects with CKD than in the healthy subjects. Both of these values fell outside of the 90% confidence interval of equivalence. For tecarfarin, the difference was less than 15% higher. Elimination half-life (t1/2) increased by 20% for (S)-warfarin and by 8% for (R,S)-warfarin and decreased by 8% for tecarfarin. A Phase III trial with 1000 people fully enriched with patients known to have at least two factors reducing CYP2C9 function, also comparing tecarfarin to warfarin, is planned.
