= Brodifacoum =

Names
- IUPAC name 3-[3-[4-(4-Bromophenyl)phenyl]-1,2,3,4-tetrahydronaphthalen-1-yl]-2-hydroxychromen-4-one
- Other names Bromfenacoum

Identifiers
CAS Number	56073-10-0
3D model (JSmol)	Interactive image
ChEMBL	ChEMBL233451
ChemSpider	10444663
ECHA InfoCard	100.054.509
PubChem CID	41736
RTECS number	GN4934750
UNII	A25P3CP5S7
CompTox Dashboard (EPA)	DTXSID5032529
- InChI: InChI=1S/C31H23BrO3/c32-24-15-13-20(14-16-24)19-9-11-21(12-10-19)23-17-22-5-1-2-6-25(22)27(18-23)29-30(33)26-7-3-4-8-28(26)35-31(29)34/h1-16,23,27,33H,17-18H2 Key: VEUZZDOCACZPRY-UHFFFAOYSA-N; InChI=1/C31H23BrO3/c32-24-15-13-20(14-16-24)19-9-11-21(12-10-19)23-17-22-5-1-2-6-25(22)27(18-23)29-30(33)26-7-3-4-8-28(26)35-31(29)34/h1-16,23,27,33H,17-18H2 Key: VEUZZDOCACZPRY-UHFFFAOYAI
- SMILES: Brc1ccc(cc1)c2ccc(cc2)C4Cc3ccccc3C(C4)C\5=C(/O)c6ccccc6OC/5=O

Properties
Chemical formula	C_{31}H_{23}BrO_{3}
Molar mass	523.426 g·mol^{−1}
Melting point	228 to 230 °C (442 to 446 °F; 501 to 503 K)
Solubility in water	Insoluble

Pharmacology
Routes of administration	Oral; dermal; inhalation (dusts) (for poisoning)
- Pharmacokinetics
Bioavailability	100%
Metabolism	slow, incomplete, hepatic
Biological half-life	Slow; 20—130 days
Excretion	faeces; very slow

Hazards
- Lethal dose or concentration (LD, LC)
LD_{50} (median dose)	270 μg/kg (rat, oral)
- Except where otherwise noted, data are given for materials in their standard state (at 25 °C [77 °F], 100 kPa). verify (what is ?) Infobox references

Brodifacoum is a highly lethal 4-hydroxycoumarin vitamin K antagonist anticoagulant poison. In recent years, it has become one of the world's most widely used pesticides. It is typically used as a rodenticide, but is also used to control larger pests such as possums.

Brodifacoum has an especially long half-life in the body, which ranges up to nine months, requiring prolonged treatment with antidotal vitamin K for both human and pet poisonings. It has one of the highest risks of secondary poisoning to both mammals and birds. Significant experience in brodifacoum poisonings has been gained in many human cases where it has been used in attempted suicides, necessitating long periods of vitamin K treatment. In March 2018, cases of severe coagulopathy and bleeding associated with synthetic cannabinoid use contaminated with brodifacoum were reported in five states of the US.

== Chemical synthesis ==
Brodifacoum is a derivative of the 4-hydroxy-coumarin group. Compounds numbers are found next to their respective compounds in the image below. Compound 1 is the starting ester needed to synthesize brodifacoum. To obtain this starting Compound 1, a simple Wittig condensation of ethyl chloroacetate with 4’-bromobiphenylcarboxaldehyde is accomplished. Compound 1 is transformed into Compound 2 by consecutive hydrolysis, halogenation to form an acid chloride, and then reacted with the required lithium anion. This is done using KOH and EtOH for hydrolysis, and then adding SOCl_{2} for chlorination to form the acid chloride which reacts with the addition of lithium anion. Compound 2 is then transformed using organocopper chemistry to yield Compound 3 with good stereoselectivity of about 98%. Typically, a Friedel-Crafts type cyclization would then be used to obtain the two-ring system portion of Compound 4, but this results in low yield. Instead, trifluoromethanesulfonic acid in dry benzene catalyzes the cyclization with good yield. The ketone is then reduced with sodium borohydride yielding a benzyl alcohol. Condensation with 4-hydroxycoumarin under HCl yields Compound 5, brodifacoum.

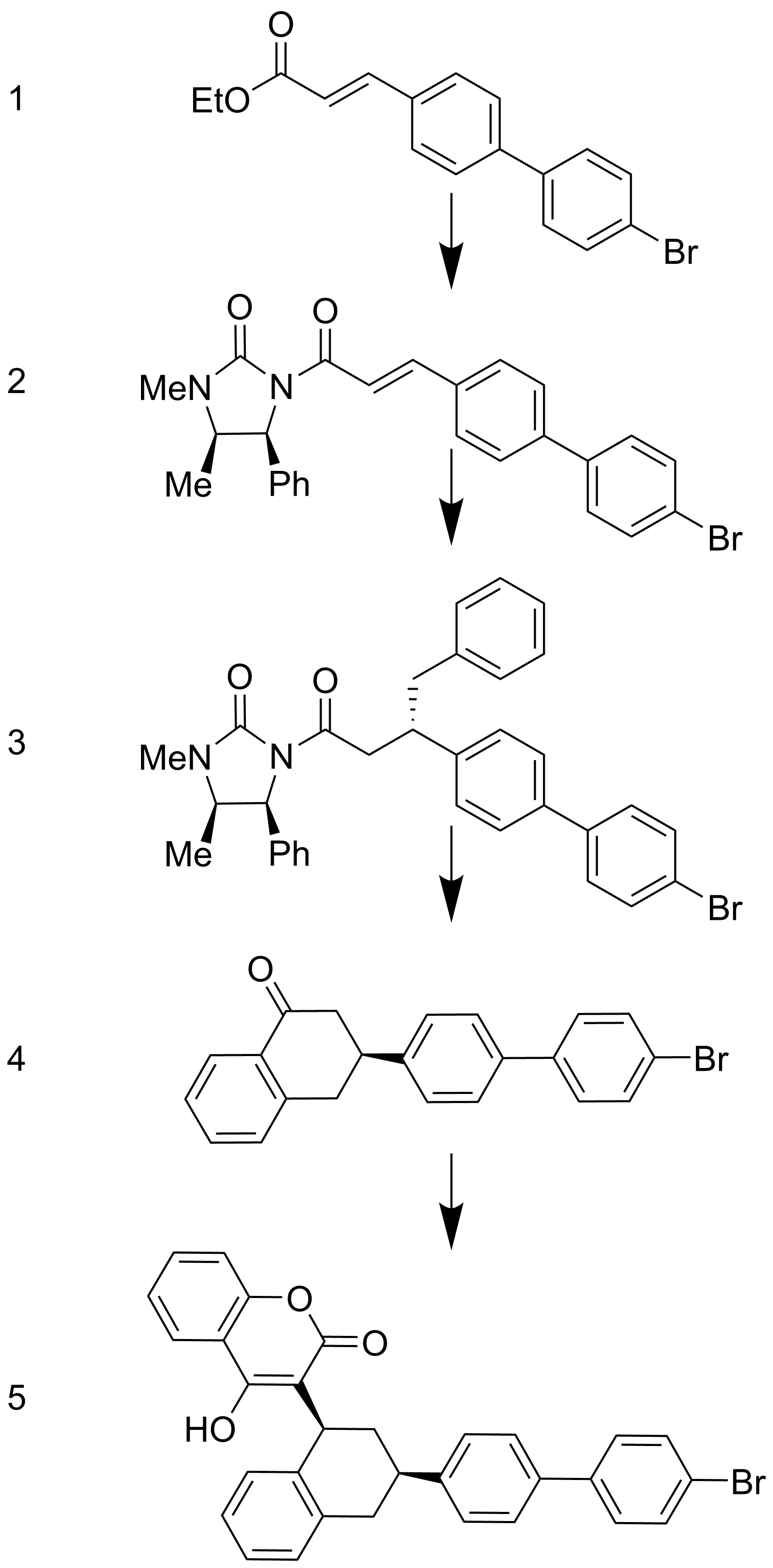
Stereospecific formation of Brodifacoum using an asymmetric organocopper compound.

== Toxicology ==
Brodifacoum is a 4-hydroxycoumarin anticoagulant, with a similar mode of action to its historical predecessors dicoumarol and warfarin. However, due to very high potency and long duration of action (elimination half-life of 20 – 130 days), it is characterised as a "second-generation" or "superwarfarin" anticoagulant.

Brodifacoum inhibits the enzyme vitamin K epoxide reductase, which is needed for the reconstitution of the vitamin K in its cycle from vitamin K-epoxide, so brodifacoum steadily decreases the level of active vitamin K in the blood. Vitamin K is required for the synthesis of important substances including prothrombin, which is involved in blood clotting. This disruption becomes increasingly severe until the blood effectively loses any ability to clot.

In addition, brodifacoum (as with other anticoagulants in toxic doses) increases permeability of blood capillaries; the blood plasma and blood itself begin to leak from the smallest blood vessels. A poisoned animal suffers progressively worsening internal bleeding, leading to shock, loss of consciousness, and eventually death.

Brodifacoum is highly lethal to mammals and birds, and extremely lethal to fish. It is a highly cumulative poison, due to its high lipophilicity and extremely slow elimination.

Following are acute LD_{50} values for a variety of animals:

* rats (oral)	0.27 mg/kg b.w.
* mice (oral)	0.40 mg/kg b.w.
* rabbits (oral)	0.30 mg/kg b.w.
* guinea-pigs (oral)	0.28 mg/kg b.w.
* squirrels (oral)	0.13 mg/kg b.w.
* cats (oral)	0.25 mg/kg b.w. — 25 mg/kg b.w.
* dogs (oral)	0.25 — 3.6 mg/kg b.w.
* birds	LD_{50} values for various birds vary from about 1 mg/kg b.w. — 20 mg/kg b.w.
* fish — LC_{50} for fish:
** trout (96 hours exposure)	0.04 ppm

As brodifacoum is not selective and can cause secondary poisoning of predators, its outdoor use is either banned or not recommended; the only exception is use for rodent eradication from islands (where it is feasible), because invasive rodents can be destructive for seabirds. Biological resistance to brodifacoum has been indicated in some species of rats in sample studies

== Brand names ==
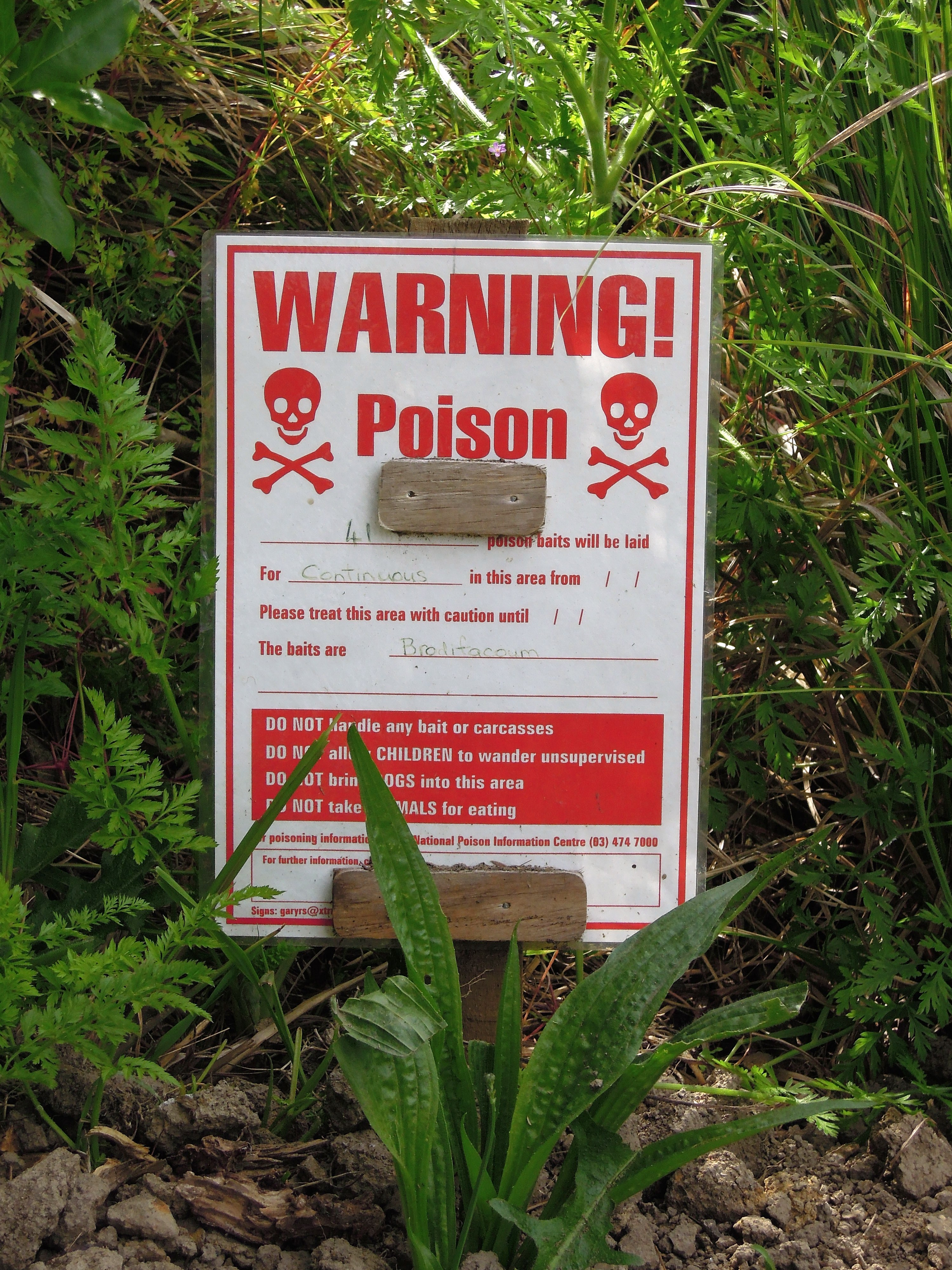
Notice about laying of brodifacoum baits in New Zealand

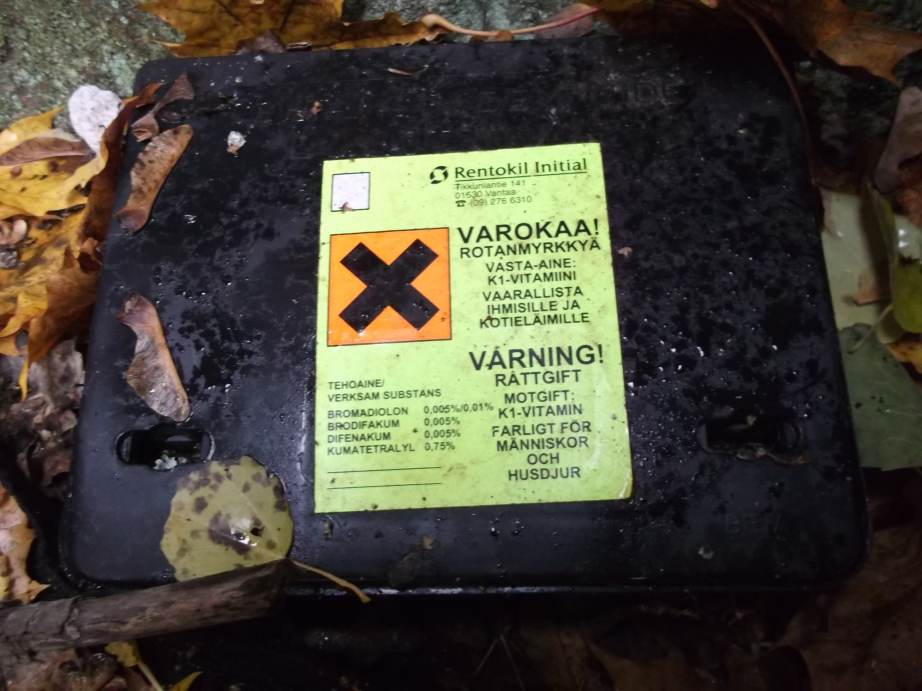
Baitbox containing brodifacoum in Finland

Brodifacoum is marketed under many trade names, including Arakus (Advansia), Biosnap, d-CON, Finale, Fologorat, Havoc, Jaguar, Klerat, Matikus, Mouser, Pestoff, Rakan, Ratak+, Rataquill Colombia, Ratshot Red, Rattex, Rodend, Rodenthor, Ratsak, Talon, Volak, Vertox, and Volid.

== Human poisoning ==
=== Treatment ===
The primary antidote to brodifacoum poisoning is immediate administration of vitamin K_{1} (dosage for humans: initially slow intravenous injections of 10–25 mg repeated at 3–6 hours until normalisation of the prothrombin time; then 10 mg orally four times daily as a "maintenance dose"). It is an extremely effective antidote, provided the poisoning is caught before excessive bleeding ensues. As high doses of brodifacoum can affect the body for many months, the antidote must be administered regularly for a long period (several months, in keeping with the substance's half-life) with frequent monitoring of the prothrombin time.

If unabsorbed poison is still in the digestive system, gastric lavage followed by administration of activated charcoal may be required.

Further treatments to be considered include infusion of blood or plasma to counteract hypovolemic shock, and in severe cases, infusion of blood clotting factor concentrate.

=== Case reports ===
Cases of brodifacoum intoxication have been reported in the human medical literature.

In one report, a woman deliberately consumed over 1.5 kg (3 lb) of rat bait, constituting about 75 mg brodifacoum, but made a full recovery after receiving conventional medical treatment.

In another case reported in 2013, a 48-year-old female patient reported 4 days of mild dyspnea, dry cough, bilateral popliteal fossae pain, and diffuse upper abdominal pain. She had no history of liver disease or alcohol or illicit substance abuse. Initial physical examination was remarkable only for mildly pale conjunctivae and mild abdominal tenderness and pain in the left popliteal fossa. A complete blood count and complete metabolic panel were normal. Prothrombin time (PT) was above 100 s, partial thromboplastin time (PTT) was above 200 s and international normalized ratio (INR) was reported as above 12.0. Urinalysis revealed hematuria (blood in the urine). Venous Doppler ultrasound of lower extremities demonstrated left popliteal vein thrombosis. Computed tomography scan of the abdomen demonstrated transmural hematoma, and a fecal occult blood test was positive. A full anticoagulant work-up showed critical reduction of vitamin K-dependent factors II, VII, IX, and X. PT and PTT corrected with mixing studies proving factor deficiency as the cause of the coagulopathy. Lupus anticoagulant studies were negative. Superwarfarin toxicity was suspected and confirmed with an anticoagulant poison panel positive for brodifacoum. The patient was hospitalized and successfully treated with fresh frozen plasma, cryoprecipitate, and vitamin K. In conclusion, paradoxical thrombosis and hemorrhage should raise the suspicion for superwarfarin toxicity in the appropriate clinical setting. Concomitant presentation for thrombosis and hemorrhage with remarkably abnormal PT and PTT should raise the suspicion for brodifacoum poisoning.

In 2015, 19 inmates in New York City's Rikers Island jail claimed that they had been poisoned with the chemical. The inmates had noticed "what appeared to be blue and green pellets in the meatloaf" they were eating on March 3, and felt ill afterwards. A sample was analyzed and tested positive for brodifacoum; the NYC Department of Correction stated it was investigating the incident. In 2017, the city settled with the inmates for $378,000.

A 20-year-old female college student presented with abdominal pain and blood in urine. She was tested for warfarin, a common anticoagulant also used in some rodenticides, which returned a negative result. Vitamin K and fresh plasma were administered to treat symptoms. Three weeks later, she returned with bleeding into her calf, and was subsequently tested for superwarfarin chemicals. The test showed that brodifacoum was in her bloodstream. She later admitted to consuming seven packets of rodenticide.

A 48-year-old businessman was admitted with a severe nosebleed and abnormal coagulation parameters. Standard treatment of vitamin K and fresh plasma was administered to stem the nosebleed. Two weeks later, he presented again with bleeding into the calf. Continual doses of vitamin K were necessary to counteract the brodifacoum. He denied taking any of the brodifacoum found in his home contained within packages of Contrac.

==== Recreational drug use ====
Brodifacoum has been mixed with synthetic cannabinoids such as K2 and Spice, reportedly "to extend the duration of the drug euphoria".

As of November 26, 2018, at least eight fatalities and 320 cases of severe coagulopathy and bleeding associated with synthetic cannabinoid use had been reported in Illinois, Wisconsin, Maryland, Missouri, Florida, North Carolina, Indiana, Pennsylvania, Kentucky, Virginia, and West Virginia. The first case occurred in Illinois on March 7, 2018. Brodifacoum was suspected to be present in these products in Illinois. Products named Matrix and Blue Giant from a convenience store in Chicago have tested positive for brodifacoum and AMB-FUBINACA (FUB-AMB).

In another report, a 17-year-old boy presented to the hospital with a severe bleeding disorder. He was found to have habitually smoked a mixture of brodifacoum and marijuana. Despite treatment with vitamin K, the bleeding disorder persisted for several months. He eventually recovered.

== See also ==
- Difenacoum - another anticoagulant rodenticide with a similar chemical structure
