= Flocoumafen =

Names
- IUPAC name 2-Hydroxy-3-[3-[4-([4-(trifluoromethyl)phenyl]methoxy)phenyl]-1,2,3,4-tetrahydronaphthalen-1-yl] chromen-4-one

Identifiers
CAS Number	90035-08-8
3D model (JSmol)	Interactive image
ChEBI	CHEBI:81894
ChemSpider	10469214
ECHA InfoCard	100.102.053
EC Number	618-367-6
KEGG	C18696
PubChem CID	54698175
UNII	2Z80062XQ4
UN number	3027
CompTox Dashboard (EPA)	DTXSID1058212
- InChI: InChI=1S/C33H25F3O4/c34-33(35,36)24-13-9-20(10-14-24)19-39-25-15-11-21(12-16-25)23-17-22-5-1-2-6-26(22)28(18-23)30-31(37)27-7-3-4-8-29(27)40-32(30)38/h1-16,23,28,37H,17-19H2 Key: KKBGNYHHEIAGOH-UHFFFAOYSA-N
- SMILES: O=c1oc2ccccc2c(O)c1C1CC(c2ccc(OCc3ccc(C(F)(F)F)cc3)cc2)Cc2ccccc21

Properties
Chemical formula	C_{33}H_{25}F_{3}O_{4}
Molar mass	542.554 g·mol^{−1}
- Except where otherwise noted, data are given for materials in their standard state (at 25 °C [77 °F], 100 kPa). verify (what is ?) Infobox references

Flocoumafen is a fluorinated, second-generation anticoagulant of the 4-hydroxycoumarin vitamin K antagonist type. It is a second generation (i.e., high potency) chemical in this class, used commercially as a rodenticide. It has a very high toxicity and is restricted to indoor use and sewers (in the UK). This restriction is mainly due to the increased risk to non-target species, especially due to its tendency to bio-accumulate in exposed organisms. Studies have shown that rodents resistant to first-generation anticoagulants can be adequately controlled with flocoumafen. It was synthesized in 1984 by Shell International Chemical.

== Toxicity ==
In most rodents, the LD_{50} is 1 mg/kg, but it can vary between species: from 0.12 mg/kg in the common vole (Microtus arvalis) to more than 10 mg/kg in the Cairo spiny mouse (Acomys cahirinus). For dogs the LD_{50} is 0.075-0.25 mg/kg.

== Antidote ==
The antidote to flocoumafen is vitamin K_{1}, which must be administered over a period of several weeks or even months.
