= Acenocoumarol =

Anticoagulant

Clinical data
- AHFS/Drugs.com: Micromedex Detailed Consumer Information
- Pregnancy category: X
- Routes of administration: Oral
- ATC code: B01AA07 (WHO)

Legal status
- Legal status: UK: POM (Prescription only)

Pharmacokinetic data
- Metabolism: Hepatic
- Elimination half-life: 8 to 11 hours

Identifiers
- IUPAC name: (RS)-4-hydroxy-3-[1-(4-nitrophenyl)-3-oxobutyl]-2H-chromen-2-one
- CAS Number: 152-72-7
- PubChem CID: 9052
- DrugBank: DB01418
- ChemSpider: 10443441
- UNII: I6WP63U32H
- KEGG: D07064
- ChEBI: CHEBI:53766
- ChEMBL: ChEMBL397420
- CompTox Dashboard (EPA): DTXSID2022541
- ECHA InfoCard: 100.005.281

Chemical and physical data
- Formula: C_{19}H_{15}NO_{6}
- Molar mass: 353.330 g·mol^{−1}
- 3D model (JSmol): Interactive image
- Chirality: Racemic mixture
- Melting point: 196 to 199 °C (385 to 390 °F)
- SMILES: CC(=O)CC(C1=CC=C(C=C1)[N+](=O)[O-])C2=C(OC3=CC=CC=C3C2=O)O
- InChI: InChI=1S/C19H15NO6/c1-11(21)10-15(12-6-8-13(9-7-12)20(24)25)17-18(22)14-4-2-3-5-16(14)26-19(17)23/h2-9,15,22H,10H2,1H3; Key:VABCILAOYCMVPS-UHFFFAOYSA-N

Acenocoumarol is an anticoagulant that functions as a vitamin K antagonist (like warfarin). It is a derivative of coumarin and is generic, so is marketed under many brand names worldwide.
