= Difenacoum =

Names
- Preferred IUPAC name 3-[3-([1,1′-Biphenyl]-4-yl)-1,2,3,4-tetrahydronapthalen-1-yl]-4-hydroxy-2H-1-benzopyran-2-one
- Other names Diphenacoum

Identifiers
CAS Number	56073-07-5
3D model (JSmol)	Interactive image
ChemSpider	10469075
ECHA InfoCard	100.054.508
KEGG	C16807
PubChem CID	54676884
UNII	SBA3K9U26B
CompTox Dashboard (EPA)	DTXSID2058128
- InChI: InChI=1S/C31H24O3/c32-30-26-12-6-7-13-28(26)34-31(33)29(30)27-19-24(18-23-10-4-5-11-25(23)27)22-16-14-21(15-17-22)20-8-2-1-3-9-20/h1-17,24,27,32H,18-19H2 Key: FVQITOLOYMWVFU-UHFFFAOYSA-N
- SMILES: O=c1c(C2CC(c3ccc(-c4ccccc4)cc3)Cc3ccccc32)c(O)oc2ccccc12

Properties
Chemical formula	C_{31}H_{24}O_{3}
Molar mass	444.52 g/mol
Density	1.27 (98.7% w/w)
Melting point	211.0 to 215.0 °C (411.8 to 419.0 °F; 484.1 to 488.1 K) (98.7% wlw)
- Except where otherwise noted, data are given for materials in their standard state (at 25 °C [77 °F], 100 kPa). verify (what is ?) Infobox references

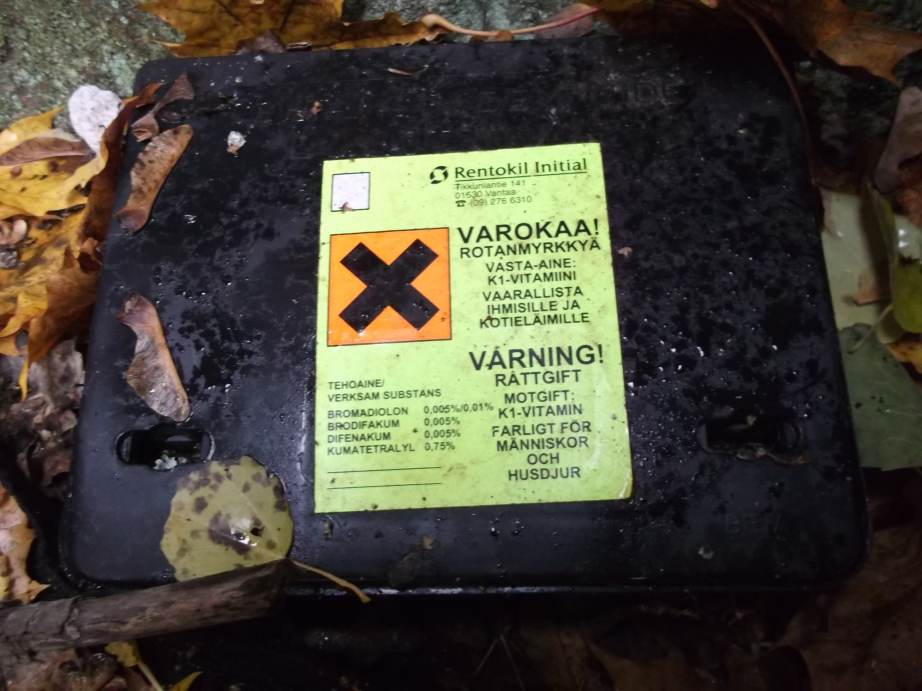
Professional bitebox containing difenacoum and others.

Difenacoum is an anticoagulant of the 4-hydroxycoumarin vitamin K antagonist type used commercially as a rodenticide. It was first introduced in 1976 and first registered in the USA in 2007.

== Formulation ==
Difenacoum is sold as blue-green and red pellets.

== Uses ==
Difenacoum was first introduced in 1976 as a rodenticide effective against rats and mice which were resistant to other anticoagulants.

== Toxicity ==
Because other species of mammals and birds may prey upon affected rodents, or directly ingest rodenticide bait, there is a risk of primary, secondary or tertiary exposure; examples are described in a 2012 publication on veterinary toxicology. Using radiolabeled isotopes, difenacoum (and/or its metabolites) has been shown to be distributed across many organ tissues upon oral ingestion, with the highest concentrations occurring in the liver and pancreas.

Difenacoum has been shown to be highly toxic to some species of freshwater fish and green algae despite the fact that difenacoum is weakly soluble in aqueous solutions.

=== Effects ===
Vitamin K deficiency in animals is deliberately brought about by anticoagulant rodenticide toxicities. Vitamin K deficiency causes internal bleeding and hemorrhaging, resulting in a slow, painful death. Other vitamin K deficient states include: biliary obstruction, intrahepatic cholestasis, intestinal malabsorption and chronic oral antibiotic administration. These are objectives of these poisons, as the sick animal normally stays in its nest, removing the need to clean up/dispose of dead animals. Often the target animals will remain healthy enough to feed several times and possibly bring poisoned foods back to feed their young. The poison is effectively transferred through milk of mothers to nursing mammalian infants.

=== Treatment ===
Vitamin K reverses the anticoagulant effect of rodenticides over a period of 24 to 48 hours from initiation of therapy. Caught early enough, Vitamin K can be rapidly administered by subcutaneous injection and followed up with by food-based supplements.

== See also ==
- Brodifacoum - another anticoagulant rodenticide with a similar chemical structure
