= Coumarin =

Aromatic chemical compound

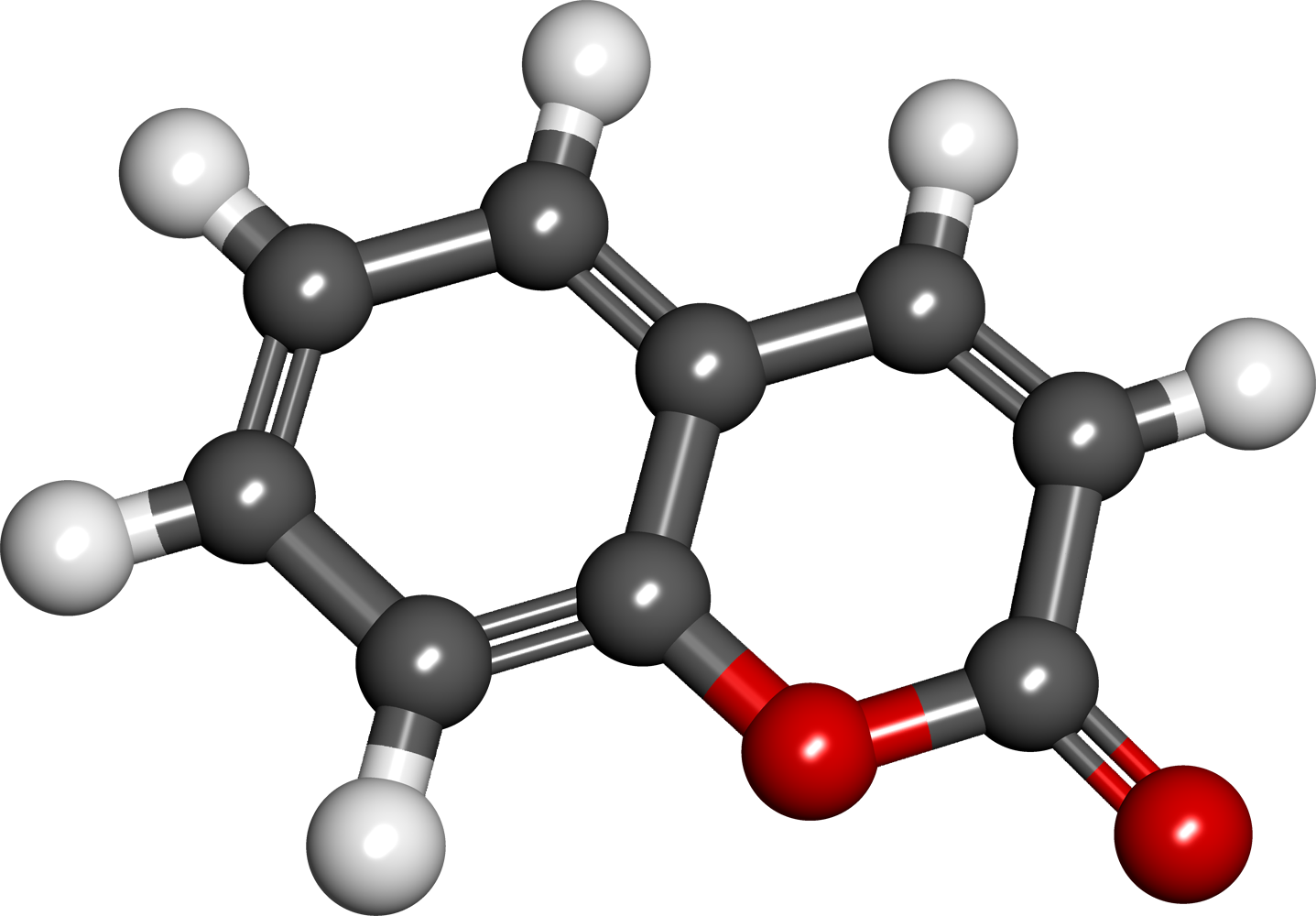

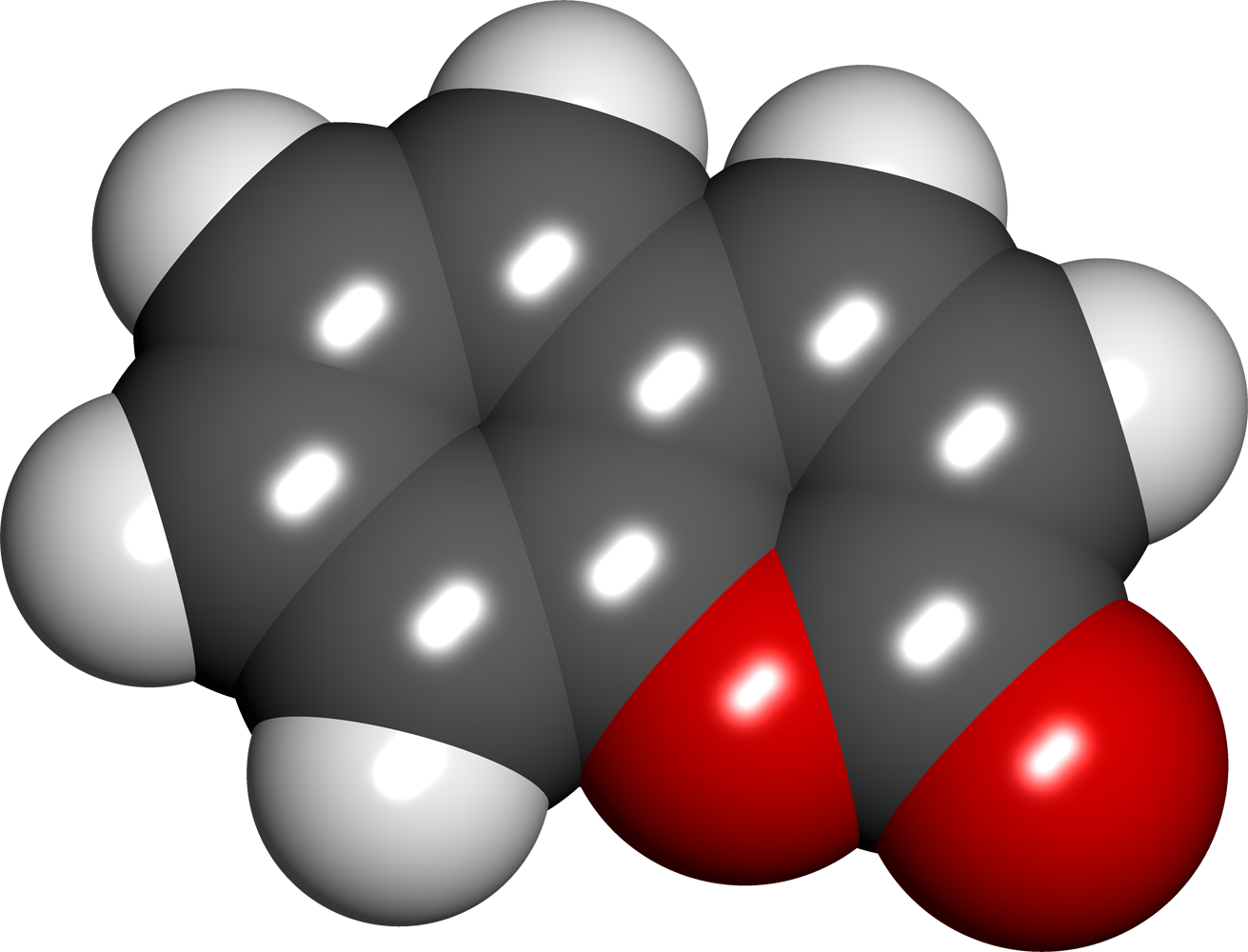

Names
- IUPAC name 2H-Chromen-2-one
- Preferred IUPAC name 2H-1-Benzopyran-2-one
- Other names 1-Benzopyran-2-one

Identifiers
CAS Number	91-64-5
3D model (JSmol)	Interactive image
Beilstein Reference	383644
ChEBI	CHEBI:28794
ChEMBL	ChEMBL6466
ChemSpider	13848793
DrugBank	DB04665
ECHA InfoCard	100.001.897
EC Number	202-086-7
Gmelin Reference	165222
KEGG	D07751
PubChem CID	323
RTECS number	GN4200000
UNII	A4VZ22K1WT
CompTox Dashboard (EPA)	DTXSID7020348
- InChI: InChI=1S/C9H6O2/c10-9-6-5-7-3-1-2-4-8(7)11-9/h1-6H Key: ZYGHJZDHTFUPRJ-UHFFFAOYSA-N; InChI=1/C9H6O2/c10-9-6-5-7-3-1-2-4-8(7)11-9/h1-6H Key: ZYGHJZDHTFUPRJ-UHFFFAOYAC
- SMILES: O=C1C=Cc2ccccc2O1

Properties
Chemical formula	C_{9}H_{6}O_{2}
Molar mass	146.145 g·mol^{−1}
Appearance	colorless to white crystals
Odor	pleasant, like vanilla beans
Density	0.935 g/cm^{3} (20 °C (68 °F))
Melting point	71 °C (160 °F; 344 K)
Boiling point	301.71 °C (575.08 °F; 574.86 K)
Solubility in water	0.17 g / 100 mL
Solubility	very soluble in ether, diethyl ether, chloroform, oil, pyridine soluble in ethanol
log P	1.39
Vapor pressure	1.3 hPa (106 °C (223 °F))
Magnetic susceptibility (χ)	−82.5×10^{−6} cm^{3}/mol

Structure
Crystal structure	orthorhombic

Hazards
- GHS labelling: (Note: Coumarin's GHS classification varies between regulators. For a more complete listing, see PubChem.)
Pictograms	(GHS07: Exclamation mark) (GHS08: Health hazard)
Signal word	Warning
Hazard statements	H302, H317, H373
Precautionary statements	P260, P264, P270, P272, P280, P301+P312, P302+P352, P314, P321, P330, P333+P313, P363, P501
NFPA 704 (fire diamond)	2 1 0
Flash point	150 °C (302 °F; 423 K)
- Lethal dose or concentration (LD, LC)
LD_{50} (median dose)	293 mg/kg (rat, oral)
Safety data sheet (SDS)	Sigma-Aldrich

Related compounds
Related compounds	Chromone; 2-Cumaranone
- Except where otherwise noted, data are given for materials in their standard state (at 25 °C [77 °F], 100 kPa). verify (what is ?) Infobox references

Coumarin (/ˈkuːmərɪn/) or 2H-chromen-2-one is an aromatic organic chemical compound with formula C_{9}H_{6}O_{2}. Its molecule can be described as a benzene molecule with two adjacent hydrogen atoms replaced by an unsaturated lactone ring −(CH)=(CH)−(C=O)−O−, forming a second six-membered heterocycle that shares two carbons with the benzene ring. It belongs to the benzopyrone chemical class and is considered a lactone.

Coumarin is a colorless crystalline solid with a sweet odor resembling the scent of vanilla and a bitter taste. It is found in many plants, where it may serve as a chemical defense against predators. While coumarin is not an anticoagulant, its 3-alkyl-4-hydroxy derivatives, such as the fungal metabolite dicoumarol, inhibit synthesis of vitamin K, a key component in blood clotting. A related compound, the prescription drug anticoagulant warfarin, is used to inhibit formation of blood clots, deep vein thrombosis, and pulmonary embolism.

== Etymology ==
Coumarin is derived from coumarou, the French word for the tonka bean, from the Old Tupi word for its tree, kumarú.

== History ==
Coumarin was first isolated from tonka beans in 1820 by A. Vogel of Munich, who initially mistook it for benzoic acid.

Also in 1820, Nicholas Jean Baptiste Gaston Guibourt (1790–1867) of France independently isolated coumarin, but he realized that it was not benzoic acid. In a subsequent essay he presented to the pharmacy section of the Académie Royale de Médecine, Guibourt named the new substance coumarine.

In 1835, the French pharmacist A. Guillemette proved that Vogel and Guibourt had isolated the same substance. Coumarin was first synthesized in 1868 by the English chemist William Henry Perkin.

Coumarin has been an integral part of the fougère genre of perfume since it was first used in Houbigant's Fougère Royale in 1882.

== Synthesis ==
Coumarin can be prepared by a number of name reactions, with the Perkin reaction between salicylaldehyde and acetic anhydride being a popular example. The Pechmann condensation provides another route to coumarin and its derivatives starting from phenol, as does the Kostanecki acylation, which can also be used to produce chromones.

== Biosynthesis ==
From lactonization of ortho-hydroxylated cis-hydroxycinnamic acid.

== Natural occurrence ==
Coumarin is found naturally in many plants. Freshly ground plant parts contain higher amount of desired and undesired phytochemicals than powder. In addition, whole plant parts are harder to counterfeit; for example, one study showed that authentic Ceylon cinnamon bark contained 0.012 to 0.143 mg/g coumarin, but samples purchased at markets contained up to 3.462 mg/g, possibly because those were mixed with other cinnamon varieties.

- Vanilla grass (Anthoxanthum odoratum)
- Sweet woodruff (Galium odoratum)
- Sweet grass (Hierochloe odorata)
- Sweet-clover (genus Melilotus)
- Meranti trees (genus Shorea)
- Tonka bean (Dipteryx odorata)
- Fenugreek (Trigonella foenum-graecum)
- Cinnamon; different varieties containing different levels of coumarin:
  - Ceylon cinnamon or true cinnamon (Cinnamomum verum): 0.005 to 0.090 mg/g
  - Chinese cinnamon or Chinese cassia (C. cassia): 1.74 to 7.67 mg/g
  - Indonesian cinnamon or Padang cassia (C. burmannii): 2.14 to 9.30 mg/g
  - Saigon cinnamon or Vietnamese cassia (C. loureiroi): 1.06 to 6.97 mg/g
- Deertongue (Carphephorus odoratissimus),
- Tilo (Justicia pectoralis),
- Mullein (genus Verbascum)
- Many cherry blossom tree varieties (of the genus Prunus).
- Related compounds are found in some but not all specimens of genus Glycyrrhiza, from which the root and flavour licorice derives.

Coumarin is found naturally also in many edible plants such as strawberries, black currants, apricots, and cherries.

Coumarins were found to be uncommon but occasional components of propolis by Santos-Buelga and Gonzalez-Paramas 2017.

=== Biological function ===
Coumarin has appetite-suppressing properties, which may discourage animals from eating plants that contain it. Though the compound has a pleasant sweet odor, it has a bitter taste, and animals tend to avoid it.

=== Metabolism ===
The biosynthesis of coumarin in plants is via hydroxylation, glycolysis, and cyclization of cinnamic acid. In humans, the enzyme encoded by the gene UGT1A8 has glucuronidase activity with many substrates, including coumarins.

== Derivatives ==
Coumarin is used in the pharmaceutical industry as a precursor reagent in the synthesis of a number of synthetic anticoagulant pharmaceuticals similar to dicoumarol. 4-hydroxycoumarins are a type of vitamin K antagonist. They block the regeneration and recycling of vitamin K. These chemicals are sometimes also incorrectly referred to as "coumadins" rather than 4-hydroxycoumarins. Some of the 4-hydroxycoumarin anticoagulant class of chemicals are designed to have high potency and long residence times in the body, and these are used specifically as rodenticides ("rat poison"). Death occurs after a period of several days to two weeks, usually from internal hemorrhaging.

== Uses ==
Coumarin is often found in artificial vanilla substitutes, despite having been banned as a food additive in numerous countries since the mid-20th century. It is still used as a legal flavorant in soaps, rubber products, and the tobacco industry, particularly for sweet pipe tobacco and certain alcoholic drinks.

== Toxicity ==
Coumarin is moderately toxic to the liver and kidneys of rodents, with a median lethal dose (LD_{50}) of 293 mg/kg in the rat, a low toxicity compared to related compounds. Coumarin is hepatotoxic in rats, but less so in mice. Rodents metabolize it mostly to 3,4-coumarin epoxide, a toxic, unstable compound that on further differential metabolism may cause liver cancer in rats and lung tumors in mice. Humans metabolize it mainly to 7-hydroxycoumarin, a compound of lower toxicity, and no adverse effect has been directly measured in humans. The German Federal Institute for Risk Assessment has established a tolerable daily intake (TDI) of 0.1 mg coumarin per kg body weight, but also advises that higher intake for a short time is not dangerous. The Occupational Safety and Health Administration (OSHA) of the United States does not classify coumarin as a carcinogen for humans.

European health agencies have warned against consuming high amounts of cassia bark, one of the four main species of cinnamon, because of its coumarin content. According to the German Federal Institute for Risk Assessment (BFR), 1 kg of (cassia) cinnamon powder contains about 2.1 to 4.4 g of coumarin. Powdered cassia cinnamon weighs 0.56 g/cm^{3}, so a kilogram of cassia cinnamon powder equals 362.29 teaspoons. One teaspoon of cassia cinnamon powder therefore contains 5.8 to 12.1 mg of coumarin, which may be above the tolerable daily intake value for smaller individuals. However, the BFR only cautions against high daily intake of foods containing coumarin. Its report specifically states that Ceylon cinnamon (Cinnamomum verum) contains "hardly any" coumarin.

The European Regulation (EC) No 1334/2008 describes the following maximum limits for coumarin: 50 mg/kg in traditional and/or seasonal bakery ware containing a reference to cinnamon in the labeling, 20 mg/kg in breakfast cereals including muesli, 15 mg/kg in fine bakery ware, with the exception of traditional and/or seasonal bakery ware containing a reference to cinnamon in the labeling, and 5 mg/kg in desserts.

An investigation from the Danish Veterinary and Food Administration in 2013 shows that bakery goods characterized as fine bakery ware exceeds the European limit (15 mg/kg) in almost 50% of the cases. The paper also mentions tea as an additional important contributor to the overall coumarin intake, especially for children with a habit for sweets.

Coumarin was banned as a food additive in the United States in 1954, largely because of the hepatotoxicity results in rodents. Coumarin is currently listed by the Food and Drug Administration (FDA) of the United States among "Substances Generally Prohibited From Direct Addition or Use as Human Food," according to 21 CFR 189.130, but some natural additives containing coumarin, such as the flavorant sweet woodruff are allowed "in alcoholic beverages only" under 21 CFR 172.510. In Europe, popular examples of such beverages are Maiwein, white wine with woodruff, and Żubrówka, vodka flavoured with bison grass.

Coumarin is subject to restrictions on its use in perfumery, as some people may become sensitized to it, however the evidence that coumarin can cause an allergic reaction in humans is disputed.

Minor neurological dysfunction was found in children exposed to the anticoagulants acenocoumarol or phenprocoumon during pregnancy. A group of 306 children were tested at ages 7–15 years to determine subtle neurological effects from anticoagulant exposure. Results showed a dose–response relationship between anticoagulant exposure and minor neurological dysfunction. Overall, a 1.9 (90%) increase in minor neurological dysfunction was observed for children exposed to these anticoagulants, which are collectively referred to as "coumarins." In conclusion, researchers stated, "The results suggest that coumarins have an influence on the development of the brain which can lead to mild neurologic dysfunctions in children of school age."

Coumarin's addition to cigarette tobacco by Brown & Williamson caused executive Dr. Jeffrey Wigand to contact CBS's news show 60 Minutes in 1995, charging that a "form of rat poison" was being used as an additive. He held that from a chemist’s point of view, coumarin is an "immediate precursor" to the rodenticide (and prescription drug) coumadin. Dr. Wigand later stated that coumarin itself is dangerous, pointing out that the FDA had banned its addition to human food in 1954. Under his later testimony, he would repeatedly classify coumarin as a "lung-specific carcinogen." In Germany, coumarin is banned as an additive in tobacco.

Alcoholic beverages sold in the European Union are limited to a maximum of 10 mg/L coumarin by law. Cinnamon flavor is generally cassia bark steam-distilled to concentrate the cinnamaldehyde, for example, to about 93%. Clear cinnamon-flavored alcoholic beverages generally test negative for coumarin, but if whole cassia bark is used to make mulled wine, then coumarin shows up at significant levels.
