= Vitamin K epoxide reductase =

Class of enzymes

Vitamin K epoxide reductase (warfarin-sensitive)
- Reaction

Identifiers
- EC no.: 1.17.4.4

Databases
- IntEnz: IntEnz view
- BRENDA: BRENDA entry
- ExPASy: NiceZyme view
- KEGG: KEGG entry
- MetaCyc: metabolic pathway
- PRIAM: profile
- PDB structures: RCSB PDB PDBe PDBsum
- Gene Ontology: AmiGO / QuickGO
Search
- PMC: articles
- PubMed: articles
- NCBI: proteins

Vitamin K epoxide reductase
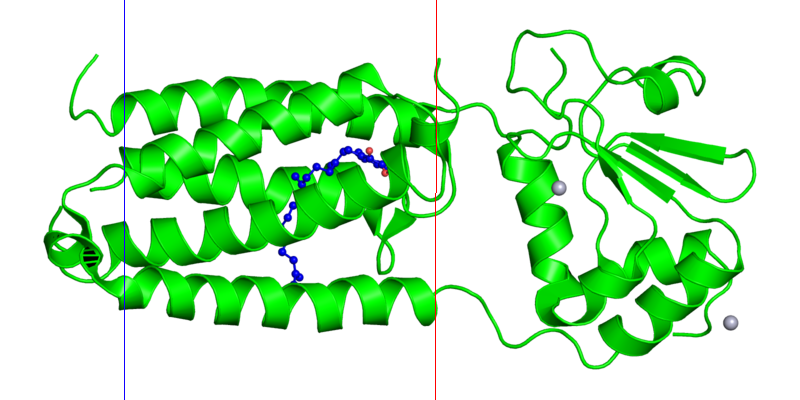
- Structure of a bacterial VKOR, membrane denoted as lines (PDB: 3KP9).

Identifiers
- Symbol: VKOR
- Pfam: PF07884
- InterPro: IPR012932
- CATH: 3kp9
- TCDB: 9.B.265
- OPM superfamily: 18
- OPM protein: 3kp9
Available protein structures:
- PDB: IPR012932 PF07884 (ECOD; PDBsum)
- AlphaFold: IPR012932; PF07884

Vitamin K epoxide reductase (VKOR) is an enzyme (EC 1.17.4.4) that reduces vitamin K after it has been oxidised in the carboxylation of glutamic acid residues in blood coagulation enzymes. VKOR is a member of a large family of predicted enzymes that are present in vertebrates, Drosophila, plants, bacteria and archaea. In some plant and bacterial homologues, the VKOR domain is fused with domains of the thioredoxin family of oxidoreductases.

Four cysteine residues and one residue, which is either serine or threonine, are identified as likely active-site residues. Solved bacterial VKOR structures has enabled more insights into the catalytic mechanism. All VKORs are transmembrane proteins with at least three TM helices at the catalytic core. The quinone to be reduced is bound by a redox-active CXXC motif in the C-terminal helices, similar to the DsbB active site. Two other cysteines to the N-terminal are located in a loop outside of the transmembrane region; they relay electrons with a redox protein (or in the case of the bacterial homolog, its own fused domain).

The human gene for VKOR is called VKORC1 (VKOR complex subunit 1). It is the target of anticoagulant warfarin. Its partner is a redox protein with an unknown identity, probably a thioredoxin-like protein located in the ER lumen such as TMX1.

There is also a similar gene called VKORC1L1. The VKORL1 complex it forms is much less efficient at reducing the epoxide, but it has the ability to reduce the quinone form of vitamin K to a diol form (KH_{2}). Although EC 1.17.4.4 notes both paralogs as having both activities, the precise division of labor in vitro is debated.
