= Warfarin =

Anticoagulant medication

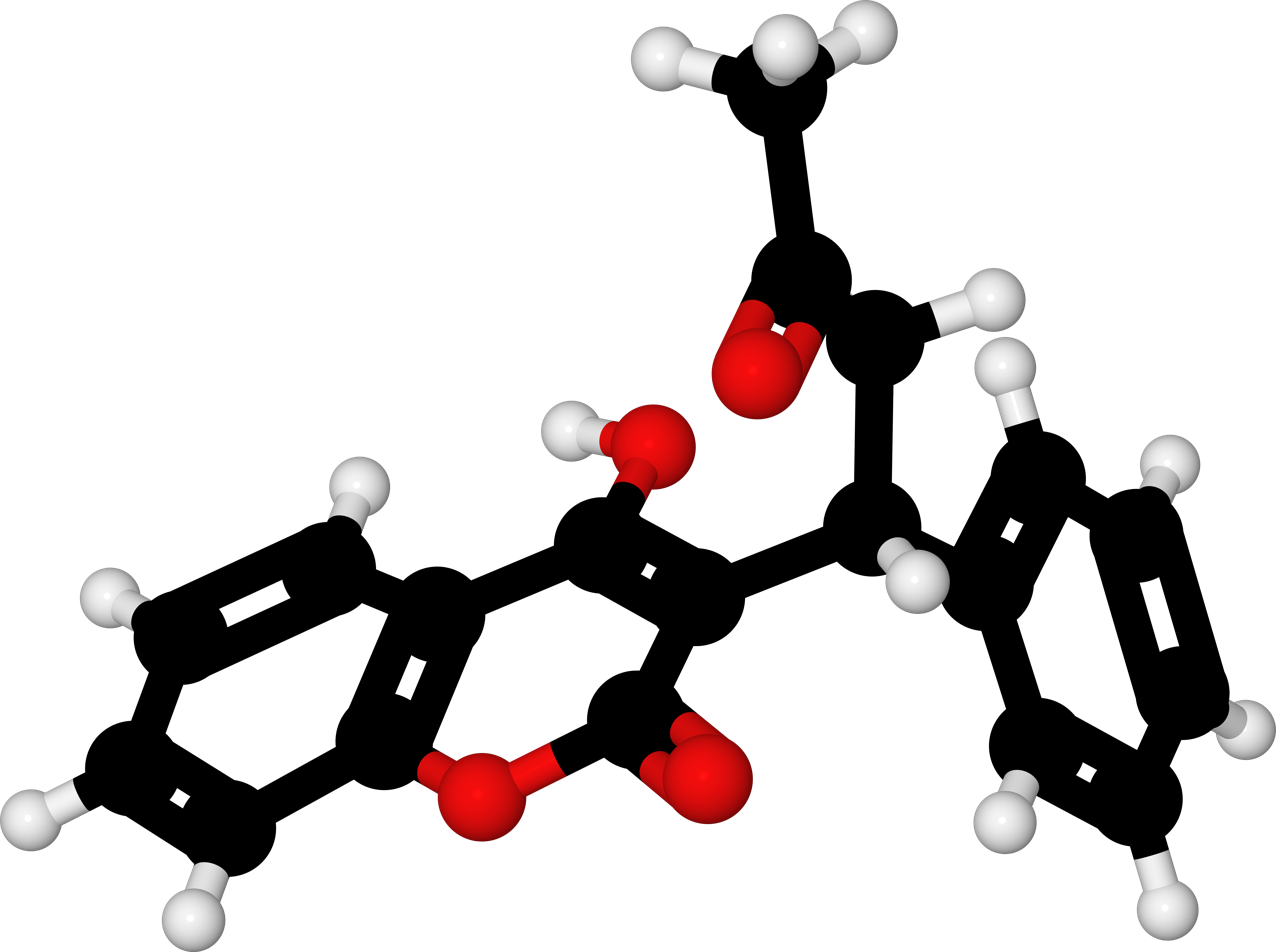

Clinical data
- Pronunciation: /ˈwɔːrfərɪn/
- Trade names: Coumadin, others
- AHFS/Drugs.com: Monograph
- MedlinePlus: a682277
- License data: US DailyMed: Warfarin
- Pregnancy category: AU: D
- Routes of administration: By mouth, intravenous
- ATC code: B01AA03 (WHO) QB01AA03 (WHO)

Legal status
- Legal status: AU: S4 (Prescription only); CA: ℞-only; UK: POM (Prescription only); US: ℞-only

Pharmacokinetic data
- Bioavailability: 79–100% (by mouth)
- Protein binding: 99%
- Metabolism: Liver: CYP2C9, 2C19, 2C8, 2C18, 1A2 and 3A4
- Elimination half-life: 7 days (active half-life is 20-60 hours)
- Excretion: Kidney (92%)

Identifiers
- IUPAC name: (RS)-4-Hydroxy-3-(3-oxo-1-phenylbutyl)- 2H-chromen-2-one
- CAS Number: 81-81-2; as salt: 129-06-6
- PubChem CID: 54678486; as salt: 16204922
- IUPHAR/BPS: 6853
- DrugBank: DB00682; as salt: DBSALT000278
- ChemSpider: 10442445; as salt: 17333193
- UNII: 5Q7ZVV76EI; as salt: 6153CWM0CL
- KEGG: D08682; as salt: D00564
- ChEBI: CHEBI:10033; as salt: CHEBI:10034
- ChEMBL: ChEMBL1464; as salt: ChEMBL1200879
- PDB ligand: RWF (PDBe, RCSB PDB); as salt: SWF (PDBe, RCSB PDB)
- ECHA InfoCard: 100.001.253

Chemical and physical data
- Formula: C_{19}H_{16}O_{4}
- Molar mass: 308.333 g·mol^{−1}
- 3D model (JSmol): Interactive image
- SMILES: CC(=O)CC(C\1=C(/O)c2ccccc2OC/1=O)c3ccccc3
- InChI: InChI=1S/C19H16O4/c1-12(20)11-15(13-7-3-2-4-8-13)17-18(21)14-9-5-6-10-16(14)23-19(17)22/h2-10,15,21H,11H2,1H3; Key:PJVWKTKQMONHTI-UHFFFAOYSA-N

Warfarin, sold under the brand name Coumadin among others, is used as an anticoagulant medication. It is commonly used to prevent deep vein thrombosis and pulmonary embolism, and to protect against stroke in people who have atrial fibrillation, valvular heart disease, or artificial heart valves. Warfarin may sometimes be prescribed following a ST-segment elevation myocardial infarction and orthopedic surgery. It is usually taken by mouth, but may also be administered intravenously.

The common side effect, a natural consequence of reduced clotting, is bleeding. Less common side effects may include areas of tissue damage, and purple toes syndrome. Use is not recommended during pregnancy. The effects of warfarin are typically monitored by checking prothrombin time (INR) every one to four weeks. Many other medications and dietary factors can interact with warfarin, either increasing or decreasing its effectiveness. The effects of warfarin may be reversed with phytomenadione (vitamin K_{1}), fresh frozen plasma, or prothrombin complex concentrate.

Warfarin decreases blood clotting by blocking vitamin K epoxide reductase, an enzyme that reactivates vitamin K_{1}. Without sufficient active vitamin K_{1}, the plasma concentrations of clotting factors II, VII, IX, and X are reduced and thus have decreased clotting ability. The anticlotting protein C and protein S are also inhibited, but to a lesser degree. (Note: It is wrongly described as a "vitamin K antagonist". This term is incorrect. Warfarin does not antagonize the action of vitamin K1, but rather antagonizes vitamin K1 recycling, depleting active vitamin K1.) A few days are required for full effect to occur, and these effects can last for up to five days. Because the mechanism involves enzymes such as VKORC1, patients on warfarin with polymorphisms of the enzymes may require adjustments in therapy if the genetic variant that they have is more readily inhibited by warfarin, thus requiring lower doses.

Warfarin first came into large-scale commercial use in 1948 as a rat poison. It was formally approved as a medication to treat blood clots in humans by the U.S. Food and Drug Administration in 1954. In 1955, warfarin's reputation as a safe and acceptable treatment for coronary artery disease, arterial plaques, and ischemic strokes was bolstered when President Dwight D. Eisenhower was treated with warfarin following a highly publicized heart attack. It is on the World Health Organization's List of Essential Medicines. Warfarin is available as a generic medication and is sold under many brand names. In 2023, it was the 116th most commonly prescribed medication in the United States, with more than 5 million prescriptions.

== Medical uses ==
Warfarin is indicated for the prophylaxis and treatment of venous thrombosis and its extension, pulmonary embolism; prophylaxis and treatment of thromboembolic complications associated with atrial fibrillation and/or cardiac valve replacement; and reduction in the risk of death, recurrent myocardial infarction, and thromboembolic events such as stroke or systemic embolization after myocardial infarction.

Warfarin is used to decrease the tendency for thrombosis, or as secondary prophylaxis (prevention of further episodes) in those individuals who have already formed a blood clot (thrombus). Warfarin treatment can help prevent formation of future blood clots and help reduce the risk of embolism (migration of a thrombus to a spot where it blocks blood supply to a vital organ).

Warfarin is best suited for anticoagulation (clot formation inhibition) in areas of slowly running blood (such as in veins and the pooled blood behind artificial and natural valves), and in blood pooled in dysfunctional cardiac atria. Thus, common clinical indications for warfarin use are atrial fibrillation, the presence of artificial heart valves, deep venous thrombosis, and pulmonary embolism (where the embolized clots first form in veins). Warfarin is also used in antiphospholipid syndrome. It has been used occasionally after heart attacks (myocardial infarctions), but is far less effective at preventing new thromboses in coronary arteries. Prevention of clotting in arteries is usually undertaken with antiplatelet drugs, which act by a different mechanism from warfarin (which normally has no effect on platelet function). It can be used to treat people following ischemic strokes due to atrial fibrillation, though direct oral anticoagulants (DOACs) may offer greater benefits.

=== Dosing ===
Dosing of warfarin is complicated because it is known to interact with many commonly used medications and certain foods. These interactions may enhance or reduce warfarin's anticoagulation effect. To optimize the therapeutic effect without risking dangerous side effects such as bleeding, close monitoring of the degree of anticoagulation is required by a blood test measuring an prothrombin time (INR). During the initial stage of treatment, INR is checked daily; intervals between tests can be lengthened if the patient manages stable therapeutic INR levels on an unchanged warfarin dose. Newer point-of-care testing is available and has increased the ease of INR testing in the outpatient setting. Instead of a blood draw, the point-of-care test involves a simple finger prick.

==== Maintenance dose ====
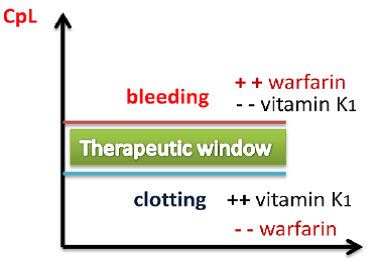
Vitamin K1-warfarin interaction effect: When warfarin levels are high, people have more risk of bleeding. Conversely, lower levels of warfarin lead to increased risk of blood clots. A narrow range exists where the benefits of warfarin are greater than the risks, its therapeutic window. Certain drugs, herbal medicines, and foods can interact with warfarin, increasing or decreasing a previously stable warfarin level.

Recommendations by many national bodies, including the American College of Chest Physicians, have been distilled to help manage dose adjustments.

The maintenance dose of warfarin can fluctuate significantly depending on the amount of vitamin K_{1} in the diet. Keeping vitamin K_{1} intake at a stable level can prevent these fluctuations. Leafy green vegetables tend to contain higher amounts of vitamin K_{1}. Green parts of members of the family Apiaceae, such as parsley, cilantro, and dill are extremely rich sources of vitamin K; cruciferous vegetables such as cabbage and broccoli, as well as the darker varieties of lettuces and other leafy greens, are also relatively high in vitamin K_{1}. Green vegetables such as peas and green beans do not have such high amounts of vitamin K_{1} as leafy greens. Certain vegetable oils have high amounts of vitamin K_{1}. Foods low in vitamin K_{1} include roots, bulbs, tubers, and most fruits and fruit juices. Cereals, grains, and other milled products are also low in vitamin K_{1}.

Several studies reported that the maintenance dose can be predicted based on various clinical data.

==== Self-testing ====
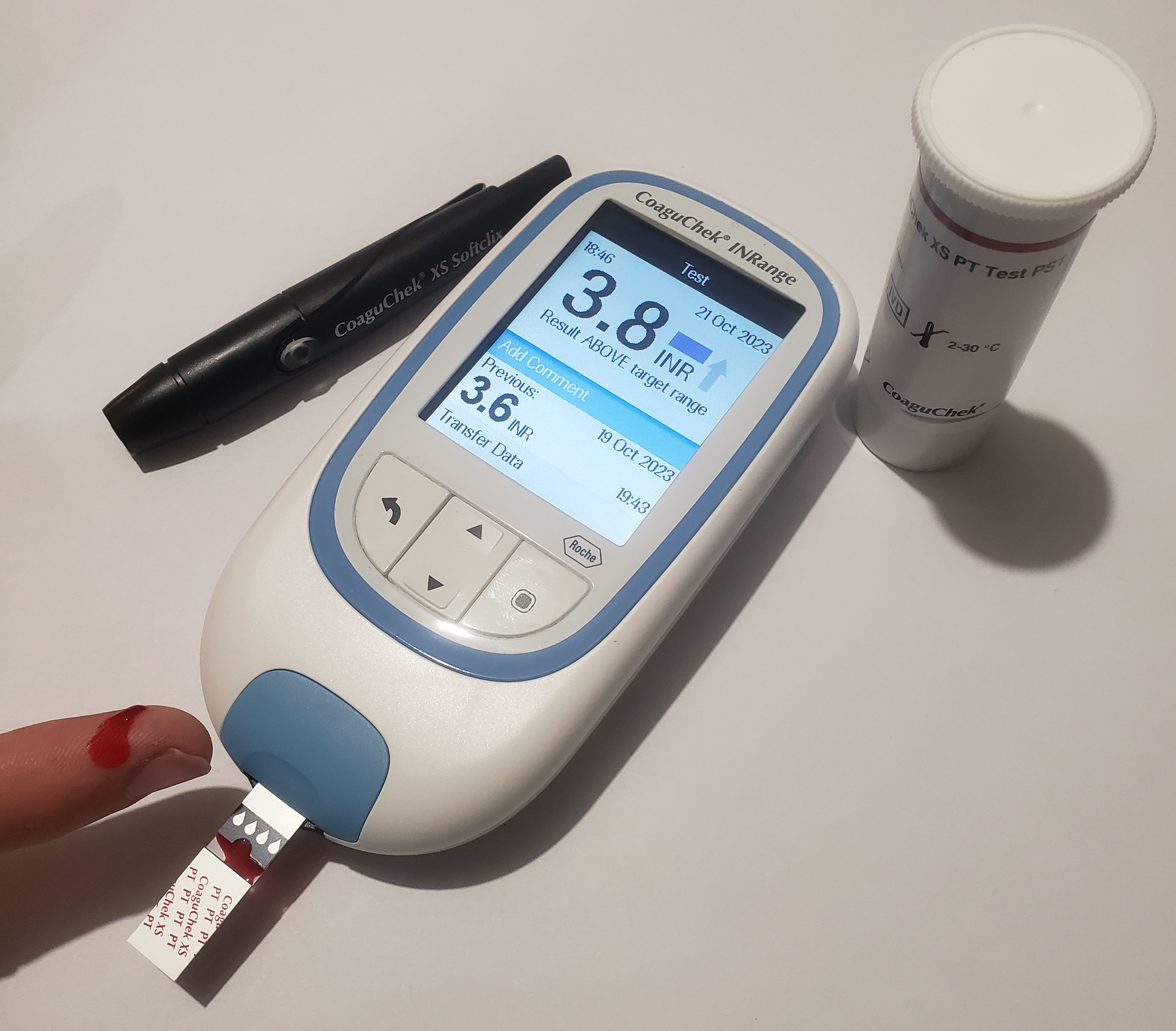
INR self-monitoring with one blood drop. The INR is too high and the warfarin dose must be decreased.

Anticoagulation with warfarin can also be monitored by patients at home. International guidelines on home testing were published in 2005. The guidelines stated:

The consensus agrees that patient self-testing and patient self-management are effective methods of monitoring oral anticoagulation therapy, providing outcomes at least as good as, and possibly better than, those achieved with an anticoagulation clinic. All patients must be appropriately selected and trained. Currently available self-testing/self-management devices give INR results that are comparable with those obtained in laboratory testing.

A 2006 systematic review and meta-analysis of 14 randomized trials showed home testing led to a reduced incidence of complications (thrombosis and major bleeding), and improved the time in the therapeutic range.

=== Alternative anticoagulants ===
In some countries, other coumarins are used instead of warfarin, such as acenocoumarol and phenprocoumon. These have a shorter (acenocoumarol) or longer (phenprocoumon) half-life, and are not completely interchangeable with warfarin. Several types of anticoagulant drugs offering the efficacy of warfarin without a need for monitoring, such as dabigatran, apixaban, edoxaban, and rivaroxaban, have been approved in a number of countries for classical warfarin uses. Complementing these drugs are reversal agents available for dabigatran (idarucizumab), and for apixaban, and rivaroxaban (andexanet alfa). Andexanet alfa is suggested for edoxaban, but use of it is considered off label due to limited evidence. A reversal agent for dabigatran, apixaban, edoxaban, and rivaroxaban is in development (ciraparantag).

== Contraindications ==
All anticoagulants are generally contraindicated in situations in which the reduction in clotting that they cause might lead to serious and potentially life-threatening bleeds. This includes people with active bleeding conditions (such as gastrointestinal ulcers), or disease states with increased risk of bleeding (e.g., low platelets, severe liver disease, uncontrolled hypertension). For patients undergoing surgery, treatment with anticoagulants is generally suspended. Similarly, spinal and lumbar puncture (e.g., spinal injections, epidurals, etc.) carry increased risk, so treatment is suspended prior to these procedures.

Warfarin should not be given to people with heparin-induced thrombocytopenia until platelet count has improved or normalised. Warfarin is usually best avoided in people with protein C or protein S deficiency, as these thrombophilic conditions increase the risk of skin necrosis, which is a rare but serious side effect associated with warfarin.

=== Pregnancy ===
Warfarin is contraindicated in pregnancy, as it passes through the placental barrier and may cause bleeding in the fetus; warfarin use during pregnancy is commonly associated with spontaneous abortion, stillbirth, neonatal death, and preterm birth. Coumarins (such as warfarin) are also teratogens, that is, they cause birth defects; the incidence of birth defects in infants exposed to warfarin in utero appears to be around 5%, although higher figures (up to 30%) have been reported in some studies. Depending on when exposure occurs during pregnancy, two distinct combinations of congenital abnormalities can arise.

==== First trimester of pregnancy ====
Usually, warfarin is avoided in the first trimester, and a low-molecular-weight heparin such as enoxaparin is substituted. With heparin, risks of maternal haemorrhage and other complications are still increased, but heparins do not cross the placental barrier, so do not cause birth defects. Various solutions exist for the time around delivery.

When warfarin (or another 4-hydroxycoumarin derivative) is given during the first trimester—particularly between the sixth and ninth weeks of pregnancy—a constellation of birth defects known variously as fetal warfarin syndrome (FWS), warfarin embryopathy, or coumarin embryopathy can occur. FWS is characterized mainly by skeletal abnormalities, which include nasal hypoplasia, a depressed or narrowed nasal bridge, scoliosis, and calcifications in the vertebral column, femur, and heel bone, which show a peculiar stippled appearance on X-rays. Limb abnormalities, such as brachydactyly (unusually short fingers and toes) or underdeveloped extremities, can also occur. Common nonskeletal features of FWS include low birth weight and developmental disabilities.

==== Second trimester and later ====
Warfarin administration in the second and third trimesters is much less commonly associated with birth defects, and when they do occur, are considerably different from FWS. The most common congenital abnormalities associated with warfarin use in late pregnancy are central nervous system disorders, including spasticity and seizures, and eye defects. Because of such later pregnancy birth defects, anticoagulation with warfarin poses a problem in pregnant women requiring warfarin for vital indications, such as stroke prevention in those with artificial heart valves.

Warfarin may be used in lactating women who wish to breastfeed their infants. Available data does not suggest that warfarin crosses into the breast milk. Similarly, INR levels should be checked to avoid adverse effects.

== Adverse effects ==
=== Bleeding ===
The only common side effect of warfarin is hemorrhage. The risk of severe bleeding is small but definite (a typical yearly rate of 1–3% has been reported), and any benefit needs to outweigh this risk when warfarin is considered. All types of bleeding occur more commonly, but the most severe ones are those involving the brain (intracerebral hemorrhage/hemorrhagic stroke) and the spinal cord. Risk of bleeding is increased if the INR is out of range (due to accidental or deliberate overdose or due to interactions). This risk increases greatly once the INR exceeds 4.5.

Several risk scores exist to predict bleeding in people using warfarin and similar anticoagulants. A commonly used score (HAS-BLED) includes known predictors of warfarin-related bleeding: uncontrolled high blood pressure (H), abnormal kidney function (A), previous stroke (S), known previous bleeding condition (B), previous labile INR when on anticoagulation (L), elderly as defined by age over 65 (E), and drugs associated with bleeding (e.g., aspirin) or alcohol misuse (D). While their use is recommended in clinical practice guidelines, they are only moderately effective in predicting bleeding risk and do not perform well in predicting hemorrhagic stroke. Bleeding risk may be increased in people on hemodialysis. Another score used to assess bleeding risk on anticoagulation, specifically Warfarin or Coumadin, is the ATRIA score, which uses a weighted additive scale of clinical findings to determine bleeding risk stratification. The risks of bleeding are increased further when warfarin is combined with antiplatelet drugs such as clopidogrel, aspirin, or nonsteroidal anti-inflammatory drugs.

=== Warfarin necrosis ===
A rare but serious complication resulting from treatment with warfarin is warfarin necrosis, which occurs more frequently shortly after commencing treatment in patients with a deficiency of protein C, an innate anticoagulant that, like the procoagulant factors whose synthesis warfarin inhibits, requires vitamin K-dependent carboxylation for its activity. Since warfarin initially decreases protein C levels faster than the coagulation factors, it can paradoxically increase the blood's tendency to coagulate when treatment is first begun (many patients when starting on warfarin are given heparin in parallel to combat this), leading to massive thrombosis with skin necrosis and gangrene of limbs. Its natural counterpart, purpura fulminans, occurs in children who are homozygous for certain protein C mutations.

=== Osteoporosis ===
After initial reports that warfarin could reduce bone mineral density, several studies demonstrated a link between warfarin use and osteoporosis-related fracture. A 1999 study in 572 women taking warfarin for deep venous thrombosis, risk of vertebral fracture and rib fracture was increased; other fracture types did not occur more commonly. A 2002 study looking at a randomly selected selection of 1,523 patients with osteoporotic fracture found no increased exposure to anticoagulants compared to controls, and neither did stratification of the duration of anticoagulation reveal a trend towards fracture.

A 2006 retrospective study of 14,564 Medicare recipients showed that warfarin use for more than one year was linked with a 60% increased risk of osteoporosis-related fracture in men, but no association in women was seen. The mechanism was thought to be a combination of reduced intake of vitamin K (a vitamin necessary for bone health) and inhibition by warfarin of vitamin K-mediated carboxylation of certain bone proteins, rendering them nonfunctional.

=== Purple toe syndrome ===
Another rare complication that may occur early during warfarin treatment (usually within 3 to 8 weeks of commencement) is purple toe syndrome. This condition is thought to result from small deposits of cholesterol breaking loose and causing embolisms in blood vessels in the skin of the feet, which causes a blueish-purple colour and may be painful.

It is typically thought to affect the big toe, but it affects other parts of the feet, as well, including the bottom of the foot (plantar surface). The occurrence of purple toe syndrome may require discontinuation of warfarin.

=== Calcification ===
Several studies have also implicated warfarin use in valvular and vascular calcification. No specific treatment is available, but some modalities are under investigation.

== Overdose ==
The major side effect of warfarin use is bleeding. Risk of bleeding is increased if the INR is out of range (due to accidental or deliberate overdose or due to interactions). Many drug interactions can increase the effect of warfarin, also causing an overdose.

In patients with supratherapeutic INR but INR less than 10 and no bleeding, it is enough to lower the dose or omit a dose, monitor the INR and resume warfarin at an adjusted lower dose when the target INR is reached. For people who need rapid reversal of warfarin – such as due to serious bleeding – or who need emergency surgery, the effects of warfarin can be reversed with vitamin K, prothrombin complex concentrate (PCC), or fresh frozen plasma (FFP). Generally, four-factor PCC can be given more quickly than FFP, the amount needed is a smaller volume of fluid than FFP, and does not require ABO blood typing. Administration of PCCs results in rapid hemostasis, similar to that of FFP, namely, with comparable rates of thromboembolic events, but with reduced rates of volume overload. Blood products should not be routinely used to reverse warfarin overdose, when vitamin K could work alone. While PCC has been found in lab tests to be better than FFP, when rapid reversal is needed, as of 2018, whether a difference in outcomes such as death or disability exists is unclear.

When warfarin is being given and INR is in therapeutic range, simple discontinuation of the drug for five days is usually enough to reverse the effect and cause INR to drop below 1.5.

Warfarin overdose recommendations
Supratherapeutic INR but INR < 4.5, no bleeding	Lowering the dose or omit a dose; Monitoring daily; Resuming at an adjusted lower dose when the target INR is reached.
INR 4.5-10, no bleeding	Omitting 1-2 doses; Monitoring INR; Readjusting dose
INR >10.0, no bleeding	Holding warfarin, monitoring INR, and readjusting dose; Vitamin K1 (phytonadione) 2-2.5 mg PO or 0.5–1 mg IV
Minor bleeding, any elevated INR:	Holding warfarin, monitoring INR, and readjusting dose; Considering vitamin K1 (phytonadione) 2.5–5 mg PO once, and may repeat if needed after 24 h
Major bleeding, any elevated INR	Holding warfarin, monitoring INR, and readjusting dose; Prothrombin complex concentrate plus vitamin K1 (phytonadione) 5–10 mg IV; May also consider supplementation with fresh frozen plasma (FFP) or recombinant factor VIIa
Life-threatening bleeding and elevated INR:	Holding warfarin therapy; Fresh frozen plasma and vitamin K 10 mg by slow IV infusion

== Interactions ==
Warfarin interacts with many commonly used drugs, and the metabolism of warfarin varies greatly between patients. Some foods have also been reported to interact with warfarin. Apart from the metabolic interactions, highly protein bound drugs can displace warfarin from serum albumin and cause an increase in the INR. This makes finding the correct dosage difficult, and accentuates the need of monitoring; when initiating a medication that is known to interact with warfarin (e.g., simvastatin), INR checks are increased or dosages adjusted until a new ideal dosage is found.

When taken with nonsteroidal anti-inflammatory drugs (NSAIDs), warfarin increases the risk for gastrointestinal bleeding. This increased risk is due to the antiplatelet effect of NSAIDs and possible damage to the gastrointestinal mucosa.

Many commonly used antibiotics, such as metronidazole or the macrolides, greatly increase the effect of warfarin by reducing the metabolism of warfarin in the body. Other broad-spectrum antibiotics can reduce the amount of the normal bacterial flora in the bowel, which make significant quantities of vitamin K_{1}, thus potentiating the effect of warfarin. In addition, food that contains large quantities of vitamin K_{1} will reduce the warfarin effect. Thyroid activity also appears to influence warfarin dosing requirements; hypothyroidism (decreased thyroid function) makes people less responsive to warfarin treatment, while hyperthyroidism (overactive thyroid) boosts the anticoagulant effect. Several mechanisms have been proposed for this effect, including changes in the rate of breakdown of clotting factors and changes in the metabolism of warfarin.

Excessive use of alcohol is also known to affect the metabolism of warfarin and can elevate the INR, and thus increase the risk of bleeding. The U.S. Food and Drug Administration (FDA) product insert on warfarin states that alcohol should be avoided. The Cleveland Clinic suggests that when taking warfarin one should not drink more than "one beer, 6 oz of wine, or one shot of alcohol per day".

Warfarin also interacts with many herbs and spices, some used in food (such as ginger and garlic) and others used purely for medicinal purposes (such as ginseng and Ginkgo biloba). All may increase bleeding and bruising in people taking warfarin; similar effects have been reported with borage (starflower) oil. St. John's wort, sometimes recommended to help with mild to moderate depression, reduces the effectiveness of a given dose of warfarin; it induces the enzymes that break down warfarin in the body, causing a reduced anticoagulant effect.

Between 2003 and 2004, the UK Committee on Safety of Medicines received several reports of increased INR and risk of haemorrhage in people taking warfarin and cranberry juice. Data establishing a causal relationship are still lacking, and a 2006 review found no cases of this interaction reported to the USFDA; nevertheless, several authors have recommended that both doctors and patients be made aware of its possibility. The mechanism behind the interaction is still unclear.

== Chemistry ==
Acyclic tautomer (left) and cyclic hemiketal tautomer (right)

X-ray crystallographic studies of warfarin show that it exists in tautomeric form, as the cyclic hemiketal, which is formed from the 4-hydroxycoumarin and the ketone in the 3-position substituent. However, the existence of many 4-hydroxycoumadin anticoagulants (for example phenprocoumon) that possess no ketone group in the 3-substituent to form such a structure, suggests that the hemiketal must tautomerise to the 4-hydroxy form in order for warfarin to be active. In an aqueous solution, the acyclic tautomer undergoes a keto-enol tautomerization via an intramolecular nucleophilic attack. This is catalyzed by acids and bases.

=== Stereochemistry ===
Warfarin contains a stereocenter and consists of two enantiomers. This is a racemate, i.e., a 1: 1 mixture of ( R ) – and the ( S ) – form:

Enantiomers of warfarin
CAS Number: 5543-58-8	CAS Number: 5543-57-7

== Pharmacology ==
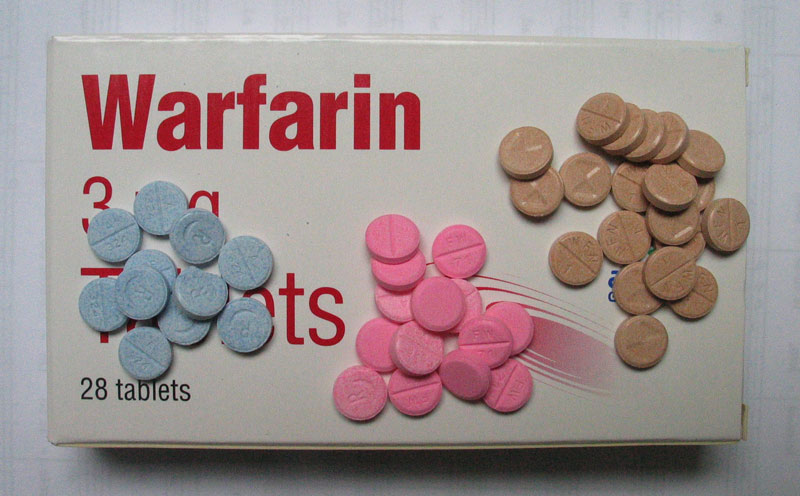
3 mg (blue), 5 mg (pink) and 1 mg (brown) warfarin tablets (UK colours)

=== Pharmacokinetics ===
Warfarin consists of a racemic mixture of two active enantiomers—R- and S- forms—each of which is cleared by different pathways. S-warfarin is two to five times more potent than the R-isomer in producing an anticoagulant response. Both the enantiomers of warfarin undergo CYP-mediated metabolism by many different CYPs to form 3',4',6,7,8 and 10-hydroxy warfarin metabolites, major being 7-OH warfarin formed from S-warfarin by CYP2C9 and 10-OH warfarin from R-warfarin by CYP3A4.

Warfarin is slower-acting than the common anticoagulant heparin, though it has a number of advantages. Heparin must be given by injection, whereas warfarin is available orally. Warfarin has a long half-life and need only be given once a day. Heparin can also cause a prothrombotic condition, heparin-induced thrombocytopenia (an antibody-mediated decrease in platelet levels), which increases the risk for thrombosis. It takes several days for warfarin to reach the therapeutic effect, since the circulating coagulation factors are not affected by the drug (thrombin has a half-life time of days). Warfarin's long half-life means that it remains effective for several days after it is stopped. Furthermore, if given initially without additional anticoagulant cover, it can increase thrombosis risk (see below).

=== Mechanism of action ===
Warfarin is one of several drugs often referred to as a "blood thinner"; this is not technically correct, as these drugs reduce coagulation of blood, increasing the clotting time, without affecting the viscosity ("thickness") as such of blood.

Warfarin inhibits the vitamin K-dependent synthesis of biologically active forms of the clotting factors II, VII, IX and X, as well as the regulatory factors protein C, protein S, and protein Z. Other proteins not involved in blood clotting, such as osteocalcin, or matrix Gla protein, may also be affected. The precursors of these factors require gamma carboxylation of their glutamic acid residues to allow the coagulation factors to bind to phospholipid surfaces inside blood vessels, on the vascular endothelium. The enzyme that carries out the carboxylation of glutamic acid is gamma-glutamyl carboxylase. The carboxylation reaction proceeds only if the carboxylase enzyme is able to convert a reduced form of vitamin K (vitamin K hydroquinone) to vitamin K epoxide at the same time. The vitamin K epoxide is, in turn, recycled back to vitamin K and vitamin K hydroquinone by another enzyme, the vitamin K epoxide reductase (VKOR). Warfarin inhibits VKOR (specifically the VKORC1 subunit) and stabilizes the enzyme through nonpolar interactions and two hydrogen bonds with the Asn80 and Tyr139 amino acid residues, thereby diminishing available vitamin K and vitamin K hydroquinone in the tissues, which decreases the carboxylation activity of the glutamyl carboxylase. Warfarin can only do this when in the acyclic tautomer as the cyclization of Warfarin eliminates the 4-hydroxyl group that forms a hydrogen bond with the active site. When this occurs, the coagulation factors are no longer carboxylated at certain glutamic acid residues, and are incapable of binding to the endothelial surface of blood vessels, and are thus biologically inactive. As the body's stores of previously produced active factors degrade (over several days) and are replaced by inactive factors, the anticoagulation effect becomes apparent. The coagulation factors are produced, but have decreased functionality due to undercarboxylation; they are collectively referred to as PIVKAs (proteins induced [by] vitamin K absence), and individual coagulation factors as PIVKA-number (e.g., PIVKA-II).

When warfarin is newly started, it may promote clot formation temporarily, because the level of proteins C and S are also dependent on vitamin K activity. Warfarin causes decline in protein C levels in first 36 hours. In addition, reduced levels of protein S lead to a reduction in activity of protein C (for which it is the co-factor), so reduces degradation of factor Va and factor VIIIa. Although loading doses of warfarin over 5 mg also produce a precipitous decline in factor VII, resulting in an initial prolongation of the INR, full antithrombotic effect does not take place until significant reduction in factor II occurs days later. The haemostasis system becomes temporarily biased towards thrombus formation, leading to a prothrombotic state. Thus, when warfarin is loaded rapidly at greater than 5 mg per day, to co-administering heparin, an anticoagulant that acts upon antithrombin and helps reduce the risk of thrombosis, is beneficial, with warfarin therapy for four to five days, to have the benefit of anticoagulation from heparin until the full effect of warfarin has been achieved.

=== Pharmacogenomics ===
Warfarin activity is determined partially by genetic factors. Polymorphisms in two genes (VKORC1 and CYP2C9) play a particularly large role in response to warfarin.

VKORC1 polymorphisms explain 30% of the dose variation between patients: particular mutations make VKORC1 less susceptible to suppression by warfarin. For example, missense mutations of the Tyr139 amino acid residue will not allow for the hydrogen bond between the Warfarin and the active site, resulting in incompatibility. Additionally, mutations that impact the nonpolar interactions, such as missense mutations of Trp59, Ile123, and Leu128 further reduce compatibility between warfarin and VKORC1. There are two main haplotypes that explain 25% of variation: low-dose haplotype group (A) and a high-dose haplotype group (B). VKORC1 polymorphisms explain why African Americans are on average relatively resistant to warfarin (higher proportion of group B haplotypes), while Asian Americans are generally more sensitive (higher proportion of group A haplotypes). Group A VKORC1 polymorphisms lead to a more rapid achievement of a therapeutic INR, but also a shorter time to reach an INR over 4, which is associated with bleeding.

CYP2C9 polymorphisms explain 10% of the dose variation between patients, mainly among Caucasian patients as these variants are rare in African American and most Asian populations. These CYP2C9 polymorphisms do not influence time to effective INR as opposed to VKORC1, but do shorten the time to INR > 4.

Despite the promise of pharmacogenomic testing in warfarin dosing, its use in clinical practice is controversial. In August 2009, the Centers for Medicare and Medicaid Services concluded, "the available evidence does not demonstrate that pharmacogenomic testing of CYP2C9 or VKORC1 alleles to predict warfarin responsiveness improves health outcomes in Medicare beneficiaries." A 2014 meta-analysis showed that using genotype-based dosing did not confer benefit in terms of time within therapeutic range, excessive anticoagulation (as defined by INR greater than 4), or a reduction in either major bleeding or thromboembolic events.

== History ==
In the early 1920s, an outbreak of a previously unrecognized cattle disease occurred in the northern United States and Canada. Cattle were haemorrhaging after minor procedures, and on some occasions spontaneously. For example, 21 of 22 cows died after dehorning and 12 of 25 bulls died after castration, all by bleeding to death.

In 1921, Frank Schofield, a Canadian veterinary pathologist, determined that the cattle were ingesting moldy silage made from sweet clover, and that this was functioning as a potent anticoagulant. Only spoiled hay made from sweet clover (grown in northern states of the US and in Canada since the turn of the century) produced the disease. Schofield separated good clover stalks and damaged clover stalks from the same hay mow, and fed each to a different rabbit. The rabbit that had ingested the good stalks remained well, but the rabbit that had ingested the damaged stalks died from a haemorrhagic illness. A duplicate experiment with a different sample of clover hay produced the same result. In 1929, North Dakota veterinarian Lee M. Roderick demonstrated that the condition was due to a lack of functioning prothrombin.

The identity of the anticoagulant substance in spoiled sweet clover remained a mystery until 1940. In 1933, Karl Paul Link and his laboratory of chemists working at the University of Wisconsin set out to isolate and characterize the haemorrhagic agent from the spoiled hay. Five years were needed before Link's student Harold A. Campbell recovered 6 mg of crystalline anticoagulant. Next, Mark A. Stahmann, another of Link's students, took over the project and initiated a large-scale extraction, isolating 1.8 g of recrystallized anticoagulant in about 4 months. This was enough material for Stahmann and Charles F. Huebner to check their results against Campbell's and to thoroughly characterize the compound. Through degradation experiments, they established that the anticoagulant was 3,3'-methylenebis-(4-hydroxycoumarin), which they later named dicoumarol. They confirmed their results by synthesizing dicoumarol and proving in 1940 that it was identical to the naturally occurring agent.

Dicoumarol was a product of the plant molecule coumarin (not to be confused with Coumadin, a later tradename for warfarin). Coumarin is now known to be present in many plants, and produces the notably sweet smell of freshly cut grass or hay and plants such as sweet grass; in fact, the plant's high content of coumarin is responsible for the original common name of "sweet clover", which is named for its sweet smell, not its bitter taste. They are present notably in woodruff (Galium odoratum, Rubiaceae), and at lower levels in licorice, lavender, and various other species. The name coumarin comes via the French coumarou from kumarú, the Tupi name for the tree of the tonka bean, which notably contains a high concentration of coumarin. However, coumarins themselves do not influence clotting or warfarin-like action. Coumarins must first be metabolized by various fungi into compounds such as 4-hydroxycoumarin, then further (in the presence of naturally occurring formaldehyde) into dicoumarol, to have any anticoagulant properties.

Over the next few years, numerous similar chemicals (specifically 4-hydroxycoumarins with a large aromatic substituent at the 3 position) were found to have the same anticoagulant properties. The first drug in the class to be widely commercialized was dicoumarol itself, patented in 1941 and later used as a pharmaceutical. Karl Link continued working on developing more potent coumarin-based anticoagulants for use as rodent poisons, resulting in warfarin in 1948. The name "warfarin" stems from the acronym WARF, for Wisconsin Alumni Research Foundation, with the ending "-arin" indicating its link with coumarin. Warfarin was first registered for use as a rodenticide in the U.S. in 1948, and was immediately popular. Although warfarin was developed by Link, WARF financially supported the research and was assigned the patent.

After an incident in 1951, in which a U.S. Navy inductee attempted suicide with multiple doses of warfarin in rodenticide, but recovered fully after presenting to a naval hospital and being treated with vitamin K (by then known as a specific antidote), studies began in the use of warfarin as a therapeutic anticoagulant. It was found to be generally superior to dicoumarol, and in 1954 it was approved for medical use in humans. An early recipient of warfarin was U.S. President Dwight D. Eisenhower, who was prescribed the drug after having a heart attack in 1955. The exact mechanism of action remained unknown until it was demonstrated, in 1978, that warfarin inhibits the enzyme vitamin K epoxide reductase, and hence interferes with vitamin K metabolism.

Lavrenty Beria and I. V. Khrustalyov are thought to have conspired to use warfarin to poison Soviet leader Joseph Stalin. Warfarin is tasteless and colourless, and produces symptoms similar to those that Stalin exhibited.

=== Occupational safety ===
Warfarin used for pest control is a hazardous substance harmful to health. People can be exposed to warfarin in the workplace by breathing it in, swallowing it, skin absorption, and eye contact. The Occupational Safety and Health Administration has set the legal limit (permissible exposure limit) for warfarin exposure in the workplace as 0.1 mg/m^{3} over an 8-hour workday. The National Institute for Occupational Safety and Health has set a recommended exposure limit of 0.1 mg/m^{3} over an 8-hour workday. At levels of 100 mg/m^{3}, warfarin is immediately dangerous to life and health.

It is classified as an extremely hazardous substance in the United States as defined in Section 302 of the U.S. Emergency Planning and Community Right-to-Know Act (42 U.S.C. 11002), and is subject to strict reporting requirements by facilities which produce, store, or use it in significant quantities.

== Society and culture ==
The name "warfarin" is derived from the acronym for "Wisconsin Alumni Research Foundation", plus "-arin", indicating its link with coumarin. Warfarin is a derivative of dicoumarol, an anticoagulant originally discovered in spoiled sweet clover. Dicoumarol, in turn, is from coumarin, a sweet-smelling but coagulation-inactive chemical found in "sweet" clover and tonka beans (also known as cumaru from which coumarin's name derives).

=== Brand names ===
Warfarin as a drug is marketed under many brand and generic names, including Aldocumar, Anasmol, Anticoag, Befarin, Cavamed, Cicoxil, Circuvit, Cofarin, Coumadin, Coumadine, Cumar, Farin, Foley, Haemofarin, Jantoven, Kovar, Lawarin, Maforan, Marevan, Marfarin, Marivanil, Martefarin, Morfarin, Orfarin, Panwarfin, Scheme, Simarc, Varfarin, Varfarins, Varfine, Waran, Warcok, Warf, Warfareks, Warfarin, Warfarina, Warfarine, Warfarinum, Warfen, Warfin, Warik, Warin, Warlin, and Zyfarin.

== Veterinary use ==
Warfarin is used as a poison for rats and other pests.

=== Pest control ===
Warfarin was introduced as a rodenticide, only later finding medical uses; in both cases it was used as an anticoagulant. The use of warfarin itself as a rat poison is declining, because many rat populations have developed resistance to it, and poisons of considerably greater potency have become available. However, as of 2023 warfarin continued to be considered a valuable tool for rodent control which minimised risk to other species.

==== Rodents ====
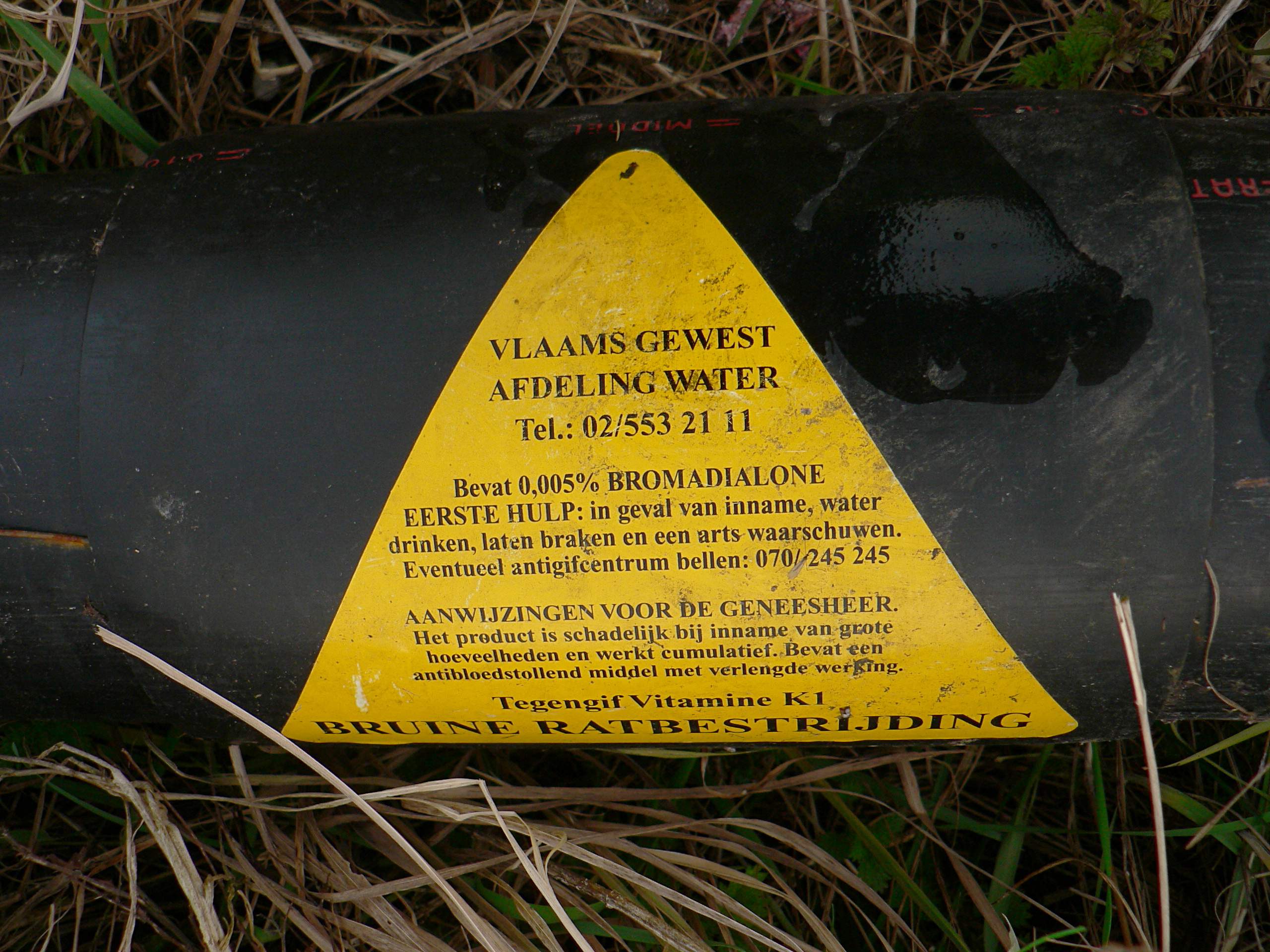
Warning label on a tube of rat poison laid on a dike of the Scheldt River in Steendorp, Belgium: The tube contains bromadiolone, a second-generation ("super-warfarin") anticoagulant.

Coumarins (4-hydroxycoumarin derivatives) are used as rodenticides for controlling rats and mice in residential, industrial, and agricultural areas. Warfarin is both odorless and tasteless, and is effective when mixed with food bait, because the rodents will return to the bait and continue to feed over a period of days until a lethal dose is accumulated (considered to be 1 mg/kg/day over about six days). It may also be mixed with talc and used as a tracking powder, which accumulates on the animal's skin and fur, and is subsequently consumed during grooming. The LD_{50} for warfarin is 50–100 mg/kg for a single dose, after 5–7 days. LD_{50} 1 mg/kg for repeated daily doses for 5 days, after 5–8 days. The IDLH value is 100 mg/m^{3} (warfarin; various species).

Resistance to warfarin as a poison has developed in many rat populations due to an autosomal dominant on chromosome 1 in brown rats. This has arisen independently and become fixed several times around the world. Other 4-hydroxycoumarins used as rodenticides include coumatetralyl and brodifacoum, which is sometimes referred to as "super-warfarin", because it is more potent, longer-acting, and effective even in rat and mouse populations that are resistant to warfarin. Unlike warfarin, which is readily excreted, newer anticoagulant poisons also accumulate in the liver and kidneys after ingestion. However, such rodenticides may also accumulate in birds of prey and other animals that eat the poisoned rodents or baits.

==== Vampire bats ====
Warfarin is used to cull populations of vampire bats, in which rabies is often prevalent, in areas where human–wildlife conflict is a concern. Vampire bats are captured with mist nets and coated with a combination of petroleum jelly and warfarin. The bat returns to its roost and other members of the roost become poisoned as well by ingesting the warfarin after reciprocal grooming. Suspected vampire bat roosts may also be coated in the warfarin solution, though this kills other bat species and remains in the environment for years. The efficacy of killing vampire bats to reduce rabies transmission is questionable; a study in Peru showed that culling programs did not lead to lower transmission rates of rabies to livestock and humans.

=== Brand names ===
Warfarin as a pest control poison is marketed under many brand and generic names, including Cov-R-Tox, Co-Rax, d-Con, Dethmor, Killgerm Sewercide, Mar-Fin, Rattunal, Rax, Rodex, Rodex Blox, Rosex, Sakarat, Sewarin, Solfarin, Sorex Warfarin, Tox-Hid, Warf, warfarin, and Warfarat. Warfarin is called coumafene in France, zoocoumarin in the Netherlands and Russia, and coumarin in Japan.
