= Sanyao poisonings =

1995 murders in Guangdong, China

- Location: Sanyao Management District, Jinli Town, Gaoyao District, Guangdong Province, China
- Date: June–December 1995
- Attack type: Poisonings
- Weapons: Methamidophos pesticide, rat poison
- Deaths: 18
- Injuries: 163
- Perpetrators: Du Runqiong, Tang Youhua

The Sanyao poisonings were a series of poisonings, some of which were fatal, in Sanyao Management District committed by Du Runqiong and Tang Youhua.

== Poisonings ==
Strange deaths of animals and fish began in the Sanyao Management District (三姚管理区) in June 1995. They were not given much attention then. Beginning in August 1995, along with the deaths of animals, began strange deaths, diseases and fainting of people on the street. After that, locals began to accuse the gold mining company, Lixing Co., Ltd. Once a group of people stormed the building of this company. After this incident, a special working group was corrected in the area. This company was engaged in smelting gold mines. In May 1995, they launched a trial production. This contributed to the death of crops in the fields, plague of fish, death of chickens and livestock. After complaints from residents, production was halted, but the company continued covert production. Some locals thought it was a plague and fled the area. Then schools and factories were closed, all exits were closed, and there was chaos. On August 27, a pond with a large number of dead fish fry was discovered. More than 10 empty bottles of tetramine were found near the reservoir. After this finding, police began to suspect intentional mass poisoning. Due to the fact that the relatives of the locals refused to perform autopsies, it was impossible to determine the exact cause of death. Police have met with significant opposition to dissecting the bodies of those killed by local prejudices. After some time, with the help of local authorities, relatives of the six dead agreed to an autopsy. Testing of samples began on October 17. On November 21, after a detailed examination of samples from the stomachs of humans and animals, the investigation found that all were poisoned with fluoroacetamide and sodium fluoroacetate, and it was deliberate mass poisoning.

== Arrest ==
In mid-November 1995, a waiter at a diner in Jinli noticed a woman throwing something into a kettle over breakfast. The waiter then called the police. After analyzing the water in the pot, it was found that it contains large amounts of fluoroacetamide and zinc phosphide.

== Poisoners ==
On December 7, 1995, a 42-year-old woman, Du Runqiong (杜润琼), and her 19-year-old son, Tang Youhua (汤友华), were detained. On December 11, their home was searched. During the search, aluminum pots with poison, a backpack with poisoned items and a kilogram of poisoned rice were found. Laboratory tests have confirmed the assumptions of police officers. During interrogation, Du Runqiong admitted that she mixed poison with rice in aluminum pots and used a backpack to carry the poison. Du Runqiong graduated from the 3rd grade of elementary school and was superstitious. She often went to the local temple and divination. One day in May, she gave birth to sentences that she understood as a call to kill bad people to prevent them. After that, in June 1995, Du Runqiong and her son Tang Youhua began a series of poisonings. They used the metamidophos pesticide and "Living Angel" rat poison, which contains fluoroacetamide and sodium fluoroacetate. They acted mostly at night. Spread the poison on the leaves of plants, poured the poison in the field, poured into the mouths of animals, mixed with rice and gave to pigs and fish. Later, they began to pour poison into the porridge cooked in the diner, put it in the meat cupboard in kitchens and markets. A search of 2,300 empty tetramine bottles used to carry the poison was found.

== Damage ==
As a result of the poisoning, 18 people died, and another 163 were hospitalized. Ten large cattle also died, along with 243 pigs, more than 3,100 chickens, and more than 300 fish. This resulted in direct economic losses of 2.8 million yuan.

== Legal proceedings ==
On December 26, 1995, Zhaoqing Interim People's Court sentenced Du Runqiong and Tang Youhua to death. They appealed to the Guangdong High People's Court. The court upheld the verdict. On January 8, 1996, they were both executed.

== See also ==
- List of serial killers in China
- Fudan poisoning case
- Chen Fuzhao - Chinese serial poisoner that killed 17 people
- Nanjing Tangshan Poisoning Case - a case of deliberate mass poisoning in which 42 people died and 400 were injured
- Qian Renfeng's Poisoning Case
