= Powdered corn cob =

Powdered corn cob (PCC) is a rodenticide, marketed as a natural and environmentally-friendly alternative to anticoagulant types. The preparation was approved in July 2013 under the European Biocide Directive Program (Annex 1/1A BPD 98/8EEC). It works by causing acute and ultimately lethal dehydration.

== History ==
Formulated and manufactured by Zea Sciences over 15 years, PCC was granted EU under the European Biocide Directive Program, known as Annex 1/1A BPD 98/8EEC, in July 2013. The patent covers the principle of using any suitable natural dehydrant to kill rodents.

"Cellulose from powdered corn cob" is proposed for approval in Canada in 2007.

In 2005, the US Environmental Protection Agency (EPA) issued a warning letter regarding the sale of corn cob rodenticide with a misrepresented ingredient list. In 2012, the EPA received a pesticide application for "cellulose" for the "Rode-Trol" rodenticide. In 2022, the EPA received a pesticide application for "cellulose from corn cob".

== Effect ==
Similar to other rodenticides, the preparation requires 3–7 days to be effective. Rather than killing rodents through internal haemorrhaging as anticoagulants do, PCC affects a rodent’s digestive system, causing acute dehydration due to its extremely absorptive nature (corn cob has been used in applications such as oil spills in water bodies, seed drying and de-icing). Physiological digestive pathways are disrupted, preventing normal regulation of water and salt levels, leading to hypovolemic circulatory shock through reduced blood volume and blood pressure, oxygen deprivation of the blood, and ultimately death.

It is by nature biodegradable, thus not an environmental pollutant. It poses no risk of contamination to crops, nor to the food chain. There is little threat of toxicity to children, pets, livestock or birds—including through secondary poisoning.
