= Chen Fuzhao =

Chinese serial killer (1974–2004)

- 陈福兆
- Chen in 2003
- Born: Chen Fuzhao c. 1974; Cangnan, Zhejiang, China
- Died: 18 June 2004 (aged 29–30); Zhejiang, China
- Conviction: Murder (17 counts)
- Penalty: Death

Details
- Victims: 17
- Span of crimes: May – June 2003
- Country: China
- State: Zhejiang
- Date apprehended: 1 July 2003

Chen Fuzhao (Chinese: 陈福兆; c. 1974 – 18 June 2004) was a Chinese serial killer who murdered 17 people between May and June 2003 with rat poison in Longgang, Zhejiang.

Chen was an assistant clinical physician in Cangnan County. He began practicing Falun Gong in 1996, which was reported to be the motive for his crimes.

== Background ==
According to Chen's relatives, he was born into a stable and happy family. He graduated from Hangzhou Jianggan District Health Cadre Training School in 1994 and shortly after began practicing medicine. He also married and had a daughter. Two years later, he purchased the book Zhuan Falun, which, according to his mother and siblings, began his unstable behavior and superstition.

== Murders ==
Between 25 May and 26 June 2003, Chen distributed drinks laced with rat poison to homeless people around the streets of Longgang, resulting in 16 deaths. On 11 June, he attempted to poison four primary school students, but they threw the drinks away because they "smelled bad". He also placed rat poison in the thermos of a kitchen at Longhua Temple on 27 June, resulting in the death of one woman twelve days later. Chinese authorities claimed that his motive was the belief that by killing people, he would improve his "powers" and that he was instructed to do so by his Falun Gong master.

After a brief investigation, Chen was apprehended on 1 July. He immediately confessed and detailed all of his crimes. He also claimed that in the months leading up to the killings, he had tested his poison on dogs, including one belonging to his mother. On 30 December, he was sentenced to death. In June 2004, Chen was executed by shooting.

== See also ==
- List of serial killers in China
- Sanyao poisonings
