= Secondary poisoning =

Secondary poisoning, or relay toxicity, is the poisoning that results when one organism comes into contact with or ingests another organism that has poison in its system. It typically occurs when a predator eats an animal, such as a mouse, rat, or insect, that has previously been poisoned by a commercial pesticide. If the level of toxicity in the prey animal is sufficiently high, it will harm the predator.

Mammals susceptible to secondary poisoning include humans, pets such as cats and dogs, as well as wild birds.

== Pesticides ==
Various pesticides such as rodenticides may cause secondary poisoning. Some pesticides require multiple feedings spanning several days; this increases the time a target organism continues to move after ingestion, raising the risk of secondary poisoning of a predator. Most of slow-acting poisons for pests have cumulative effects and so can cause secondary poisoning and environment pollution.

Pesticide	Type	Classification	Target	Oral Toxicity	Feedings	Secondary Risk to Mammals	Secondary Risk to Birds
Warfarin	Anticoagulant	Hydroxycoumarin	Rodenticide	Moderate	Multiple	Low	Minimal
Bromadiolone	Anticoagulant	Hydroxycoumarin	Rodenticide	High	Single	Moderate	Moderate
Difethialone	Anticoagulant	Hydroxycoumarin	Rodenticide	High	Single	Moderate	Highest
Brodifacoum	Anticoagulant	Hydroxycoumarin	Rodenticide	Highest	Single	Highest	Highest
Chlorophacinone	Anticoagulant	Indandione	Rodenticide	High	Multiple	Highest	Minimal
Diphacinone	Anticoagulant	Indandione	Rodenticide	High	Multiple	Highest	Moderate
Bromethalin	CNS	other	Rodenticide	High	Single	Low	Low
Fluoroacetate	Metabolism	other	Rodenticide	Highest	Single	High	Highest
Zinc phosphide	other	other	Rodenticide	High	Single	Minimal	Low
