= Corncob =

Central core of corn ear

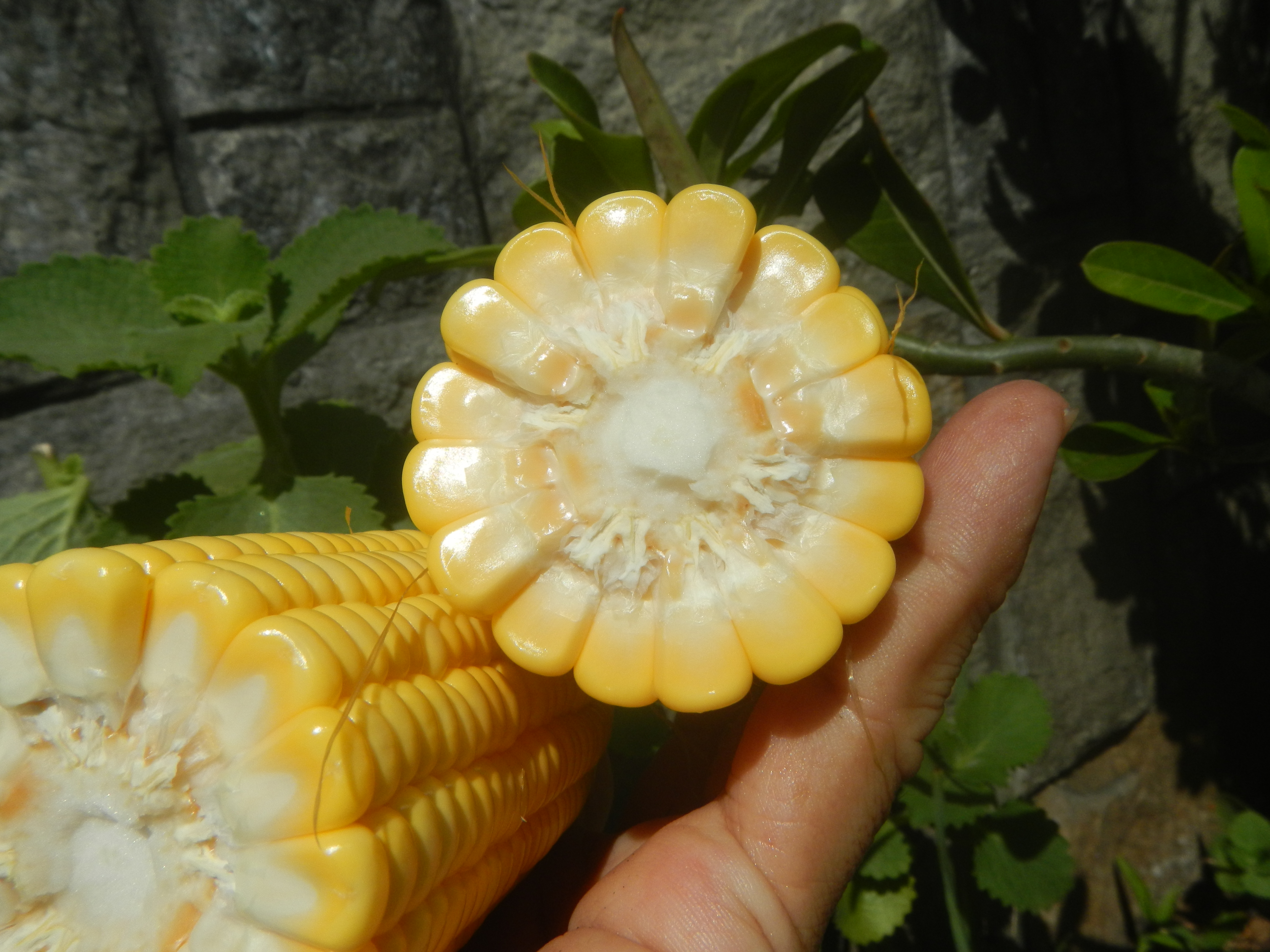
A cross-section of an ear of corn, showing the cob.

A corncob, also called corn cob or cob of corn, is the hard core of an ear of maize, bearing the kernels, made up of the chaff, woody ring, and pith. Corncobs contain mainly cellulose, hemicellulose, and lignin.

The cob is not toxic to humans and can be digested, but the outside is rough and practically inedible in its original form. The foamy pith has a peculiar texture when mature and is completely bland, which most people would find unappealing, due to the consistency similar to plastic foam.

However, during several instances of famine (especially in European countries throughout history), people have been known to eat the corncobs, especially the foamy middle part. Dried and ground corncobs have a high fiber content and thus can be used in dietary supplements. Corn cob powder can also be mixed with flour to improve the nutritional quality of baked goods.

Corncobs are used as biofuel, as they are an efficient, cheap and an environmentally friendly source of heat when burned, so they were traditionally used for roasting meat on the spit, barbecuing and heating the bread ovens, through the centuries. It has been used for its long and steady burning embers, making is suitable for use in ember irons.

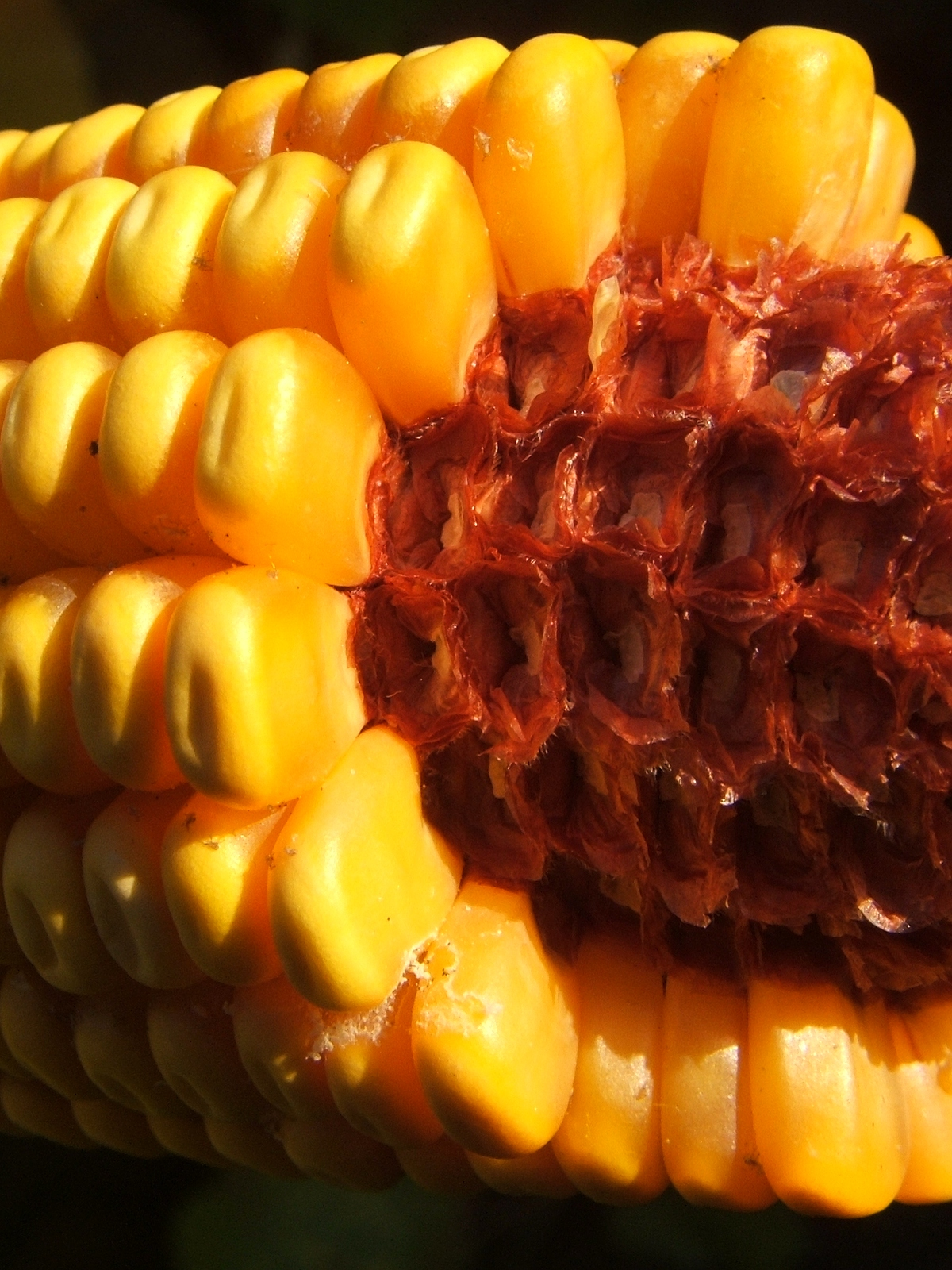
A corncob with attached corn kernels

When harvesting corn, the corncob may be collected as part of the ear (necessary for corn on the cob), or instead may be left as part of the corn stover in the field, which may improve soil quality.

== Uses ==
=== Agricultural ===
- Bedding for animals — cobs absorb moisture and provide a compliant surface
- Fiber in fodder for ruminant livestock (despite low nutritional value)
- Diluent/carrier/filler material in animal health products, agro-chemicals, veterinary formulations, vitamin premixes, pharmaceuticals, etc.
- Soil conditioner, water retainer in horticulture

=== Culinary ===
Corncobs are not frequently consumed after the corn has matured. Young ears of corn are harvested while the cob is still tender and are eaten whole. Baby corn is common in stir fries and Thai cuisine. The cob can still be used for cooking, after the corn has matured:

- Corn cobs are used to flavor stock.
- Corn milk is made utilizing whole ears of corn.

=== Pest control ===
- Powdered corn cob is used as an environmentally-friendly rodenticide.

=== Industrial ===
- Industrial source of the chemical furfural
- Absorbent media for safe disposal of liquid and solid effluents

=== Other products ===
- Ground up and washed (then re-dried) to make cat litter
- A mild abrasive for cleaning building surfaces, when coarsely ground
- Bowl material for tobacco pipes
- As a biofuel
- Charcoal production
- Anal hygiene
- The body of a doll
