= N-Nitrosodimethylamine =

- Skeletal formula of N-nitrosodimethylamine

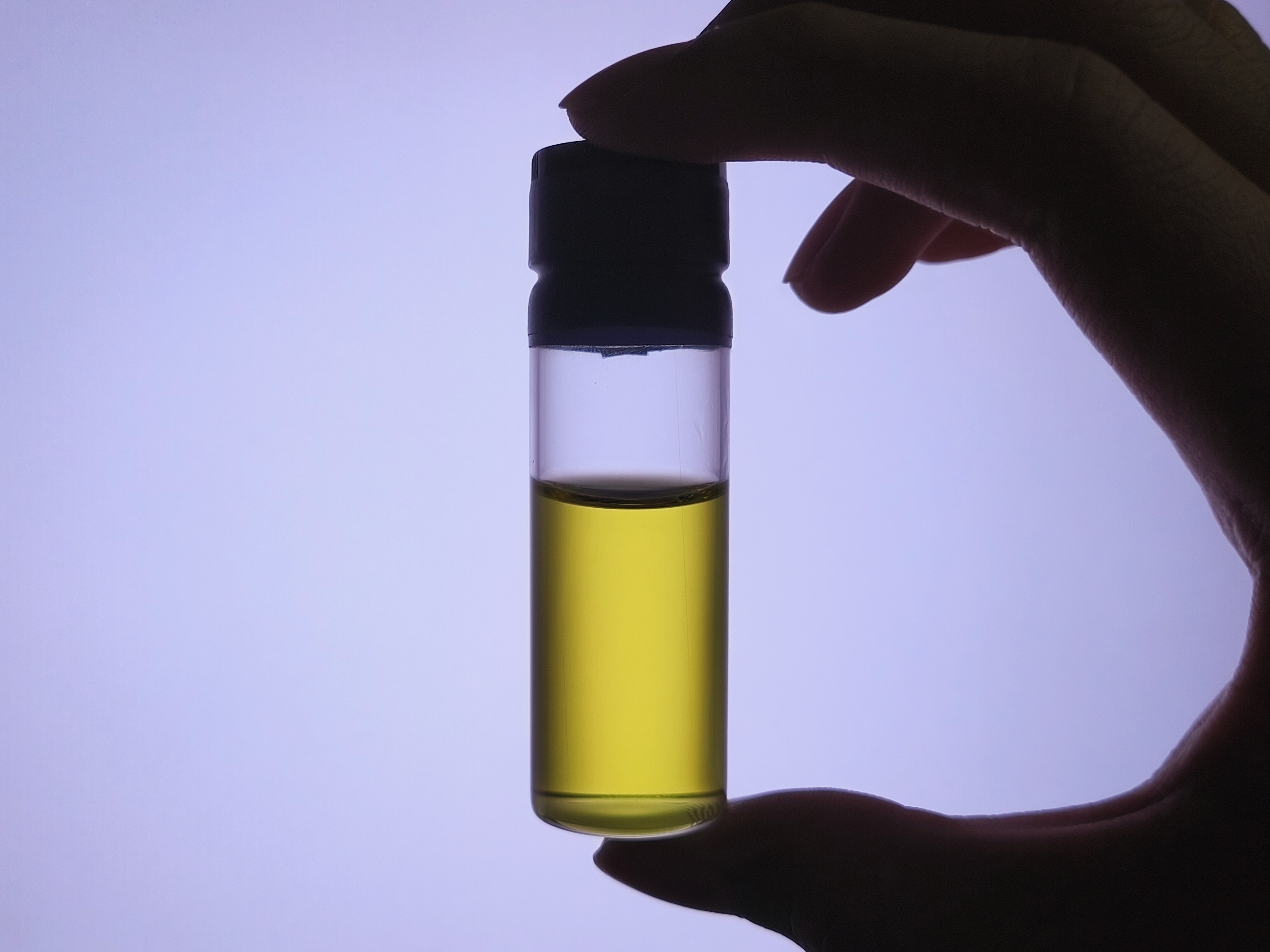

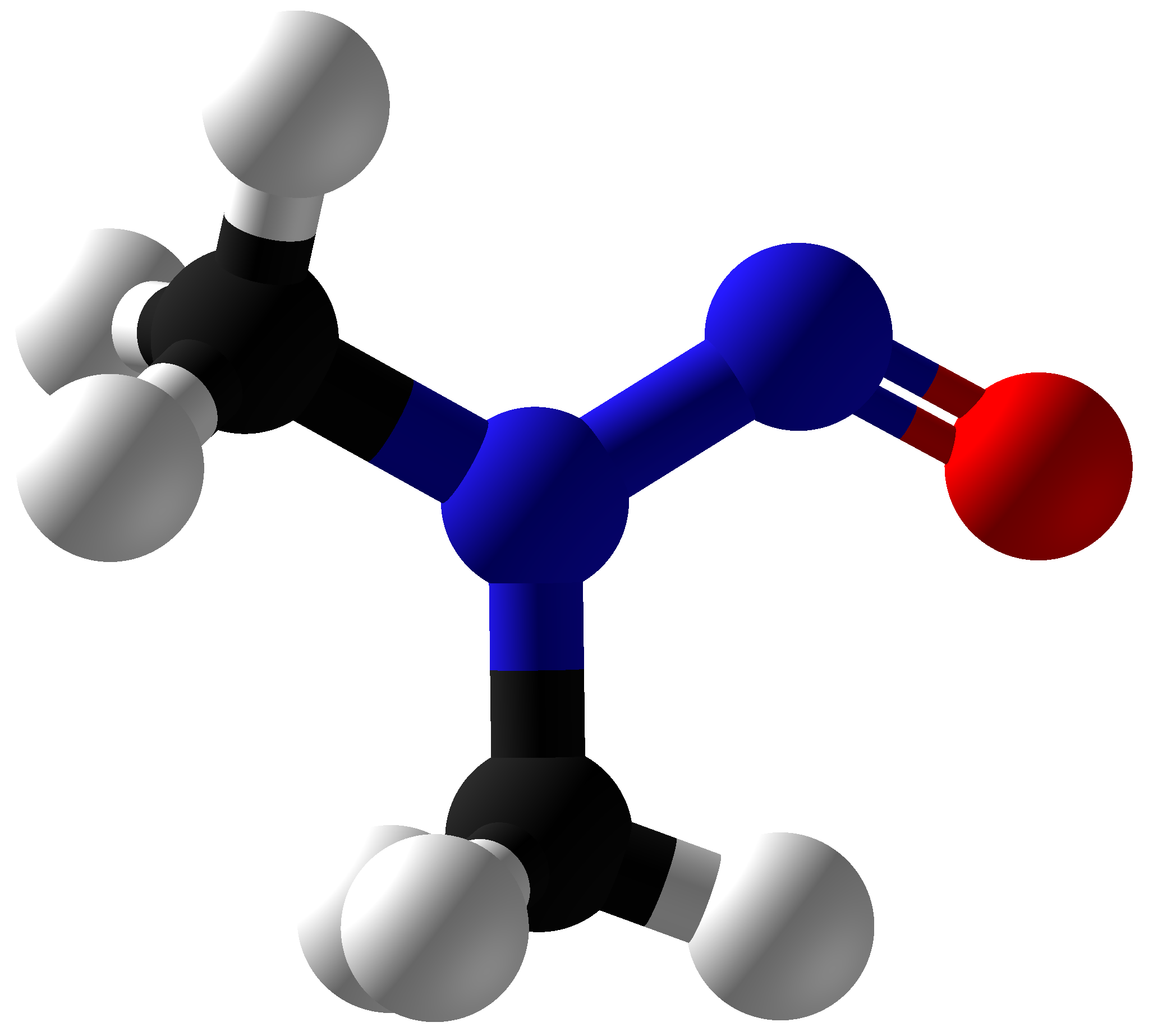

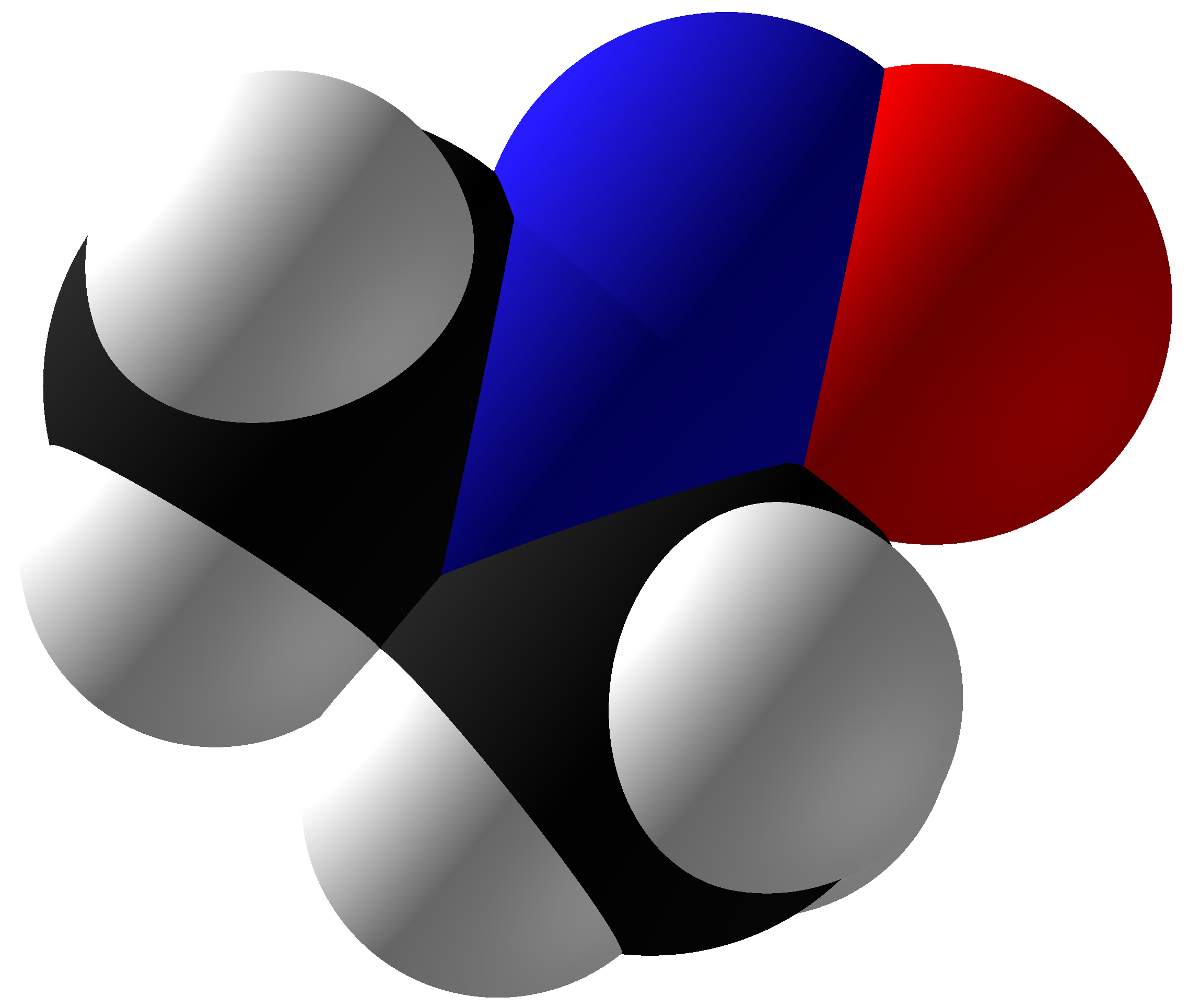

Names
- Preferred IUPAC name N,N-Dimethylnitrous amide

Identifiers
CAS Number	62-75-9
3D model (JSmol)	Interactive image
ChEBI	CHEBI:35807
ChEMBL	ChEMBL117311
ChemSpider	5894
ECHA InfoCard	100.000.500
EC Number	200-549-8
KEGG	C14704
MeSH	Dimethylnitrosamine
PubChem CID	6124
RTECS number	IQ0525000
UNII	M43H21IO8R
UN number	3382
CompTox Dashboard (EPA)	DTXSID7021029
- InChI: InChI=1S/C2H6N2O/c1-4(2)3-5/h1-2H3 Key: UMFJAHHVKNCGLG-UHFFFAOYSA-N
- SMILES: CN(C)N=O

Properties
Chemical formula	C_{2}H_{6}N_{2}O
Molar mass	74.083 g·mol^{−1}
Appearance	Yellow oil
Odor	faint, characteristic
Density	1.005 g/mL
Boiling point	153.1 °C; 307.5 °F; 426.2 K
Solubility in water	290 mg/ml (at 20 °C)
log P	−0.496
Vapor pressure	700 Pa (at 20 °C)
Refractive index (n_{D})	1.437

Thermochemistry
Std enthalpy of combustion (Δ_{c}H^{⦵}_{298})	1.65 MJ/mol

Hazards
- Occupational safety and health (OHS/OSH)
Main hazards	Known carcinogen, extremely toxic
- GHS labelling
Pictograms	(GHS06: Toxic) (GHS08: Health hazard) (GHS09: Environmental hazard)
Signal word	Danger
Hazard statements	H300, H330, H350, H372, H411
Precautionary statements	P260, P273, P284, P301+P310, P310
NFPA 704 (fire diamond)	4 2 0
Flash point	61.0 °C (141.8 °F; 334.1 K)
- Lethal dose or concentration (LD, LC)
LD_{50} (median dose)	37.0 mg/kg (oral, rat)
- NIOSH (US health exposure limits)
PEL (Permissible)	OSHA-Regulated Carcinogen
REL (Recommended)	Ca
IDLH (Immediate danger)	Ca [N.D.]

Related compounds
Related compounds	Dimethylamine; N-Nitrosodiethylamine
- Except where otherwise noted, data are given for materials in their standard state (at 25 °C [77 °F], 100 kPa). verify (what is ?) Infobox references

N-Nitrosodimethylamine (NDMA), also known as dimethylnitrosamine (DMN), is an organic compound with the formula (CH_{3})_{2}NNO. It is one of the simplest members of a large class of nitrosamines. It is a volatile yellow oil. NDMA has attracted wide attention as being highly hepatotoxic and a known carcinogen in laboratory animals.

== Occurrence ==
=== Drinking water ===
Of more general concern, NDMA can be produced by water treatment by chlorination or chloramination. The question is the level at which it is produced. In the U.S. state of California, the allowable level is 10 nanograms/liter. The Canadian province of Ontario set the standard at 9 ng/L. The potential problem is greater for recycled water that can contain dimethylamine. Further, NDMA can form or be leached during treatment of water by anion exchange resins.

Contamination of drinking water with NDMA is of particular concern due to the minute concentrations at which it is harmful and the difficulty in detecting it at these concentrations.

Relatively high levels of UV radiation in the 200 to 260 nm range breaks the N–N bond. Thus, it can be used to degrade NDMA. Additionally, reverse osmosis removes approximately 50% of NDMA.

=== Cured meat ===
NDMA is found at low levels in numerous items of human consumption, including cured meat/fish, beer, as well as during use of tobacco products and the inhalation of tobacco smoke.

=== Rocket fuel ===
Unsymmetrical dimethylhydrazine, a rocket fuel, is a highly effective precursor to NDMA:

(CH_{3})_{2}NNH_{2} + O_{2} → (CH_{3})_{2}NNO + H_{2}O

Groundwater near rocket launch sites often has high levels of NDMA.

== Regulation ==
=== United States ===
The United States Environmental Protection Agency (EPA) has set a maximal permissible concentration of NDMA in drinking water of 7 ng/L. As of July 2020, the EPA has not set a regulatory maximal contaminant level (MCL) for drinking water. At high doses, it is a "potent hepatotoxin that can cause fibrosis of the liver" in rats. The induction of liver tumors in rats after chronic exposure to low doses is well documented. Its toxic effects on humans are inferred from animal experiments, but are not well-established experimentally.

It is classified as an extremely hazardous substance in the United States, as defined in Section 302 of the U.S. Emergency Planning and Community Right-to-Know Act (42 U.S.C. 11002), and is subject to strict reporting requirements by facilities that produce, store, or use it in significant quantities.

=== European Union ===
In July 2020, the Committee for Medicinal Products for Human Use (CHMP) of the European Medicines Agency (EMA) issued an opinion requiring companies to take measures to limit the presence of nitrosamines in human medicines as far as possible and to ensure levels of these impurities do not exceed set limits. Nitrosamines are classified as probable human carcinogens (substances that could cause cancer). The limits for nitrosamines in medicines have been set using internationally agreed standards (ICH M7(R1)) based on lifetime exposure. Generally, people should not be exposed to a lifetime risk of cancer exceeding 1 in 100,000 from nitrosamines in their medicines. EU regulators first became aware of nitrosamines in medicines in mid-2018, and took regulatory actions, including recalling medicines and stopping the use of active substances from certain manufacturers. A subsequent CHMP review of sartan blood-pressure medicines in 2019, led to new requirements for the manufacture of sartans, while its 2020 review of ranitidine recommended an EU-wide suspension of ranitidine medicines.

== Chemistry ==
The C_{2}N_{2}O core of NDMA is planar, as established by X-ray crystallography. The central nitrogen is bound to two methyl groups and the NO group with bond angles of 120°. The N-N and N-O distances are 1.32 and 1.26 Å, respectively.

NDMA forms from a variety of dimethylamine-containing compounds, e.g. during dimethylformamide hydrolysis. Dimethylamine can undergo oxidative amination to unsymmetrical dimethylhydrazine, which air-oxidizes to NDMA.

In the laboratory, NDMA can be synthesised by the reaction of nitrous acid with dimethylamine:

HONO + (CH_{3})_{2}NH → (CH_{3})_{2}NNO + H_{2}O

The mechanism of its carcinogenicity involves metabolic activation steps resulting in the formation of methyldiazonium, an alkylating agent:

Metabolic activation of NDMA relevant to its cancer-causation.

NDMA reacts as a N-methyl formimine source with Lawesson's reagent (giving a compound with a C-N-P-S- ring).

== As a poison ==
Several incidents in which NDMA was used intentionally to poison another person have garnered media attention.

In 1978, a teacher in Ulm, Germany, was sentenced to life in prison for trying to murder his wife by poisoning jam with NDMA and feeding it to her. Both the wife and the teacher later died from liver failure. That same year, Steven Roy Harper spiked lemonade with NDMA at the Johnson family home in Omaha, Nebraska. The incident resulted in the deaths of 30-year-old Duane Johnson and 11-month-old Chad Shelton. For his crime, Harper was sentenced to death, but committed suicide in prison before his execution could be carried out.

In the 2013 Fudan poisoning case, Huang Yang, a postgraduate medical student at Fudan University, was the victim of a poisoning in Shanghai, China. Huang was poisoned by his roommate Lin Senhao, who had placed NDMA into the water cooler in their dormitory. Lin claimed that he only did this as an April Fool's joke. He received a death sentence, and was executed in 2015.

In 2018, NDMA was used in an attempted poisoning at Queen's University in Kingston, Canada.

== Drug contamination ==
In 2018, and then again in 2019, various brands of valsartan were recalled because of contamination with NDMA. In 2019, ranitidine was recalled around the world due to contamination with NDMA. In December 2019, the FDA began testing samples of the diabetes drug metformin for NDMA. The FDA announcement followed a recall of three versions of metformin in Singapore, and the European Medicines Agency's request that manufacturers test for NDMA.

In September 2019, N-nitrosodimethylamine was discovered in ranitidine products from a number of manufacturers, resulting in recalls. In April 2020, ranitidine was withdrawn from the United States market, suspended in the European Union, and suspended in Australia due to concerns about NDMA.

In August 2021, a class 2 medicines recall was issued for a batch of metformin hydrochloride 500 mg/5ml Oral Solution from Rosemont Pharmaceuticals Limited, which was first distributed in December 2020, due to the identification of higher than acceptable levels of NDMA.

== Effect on biological systems ==
A study has shown that NDMA perturbs arginine biosynthesis, mitochondrial genome maintenance, and DNA damage repair in yeast.
