= Substances poisonous to dogs =

Harmful substances

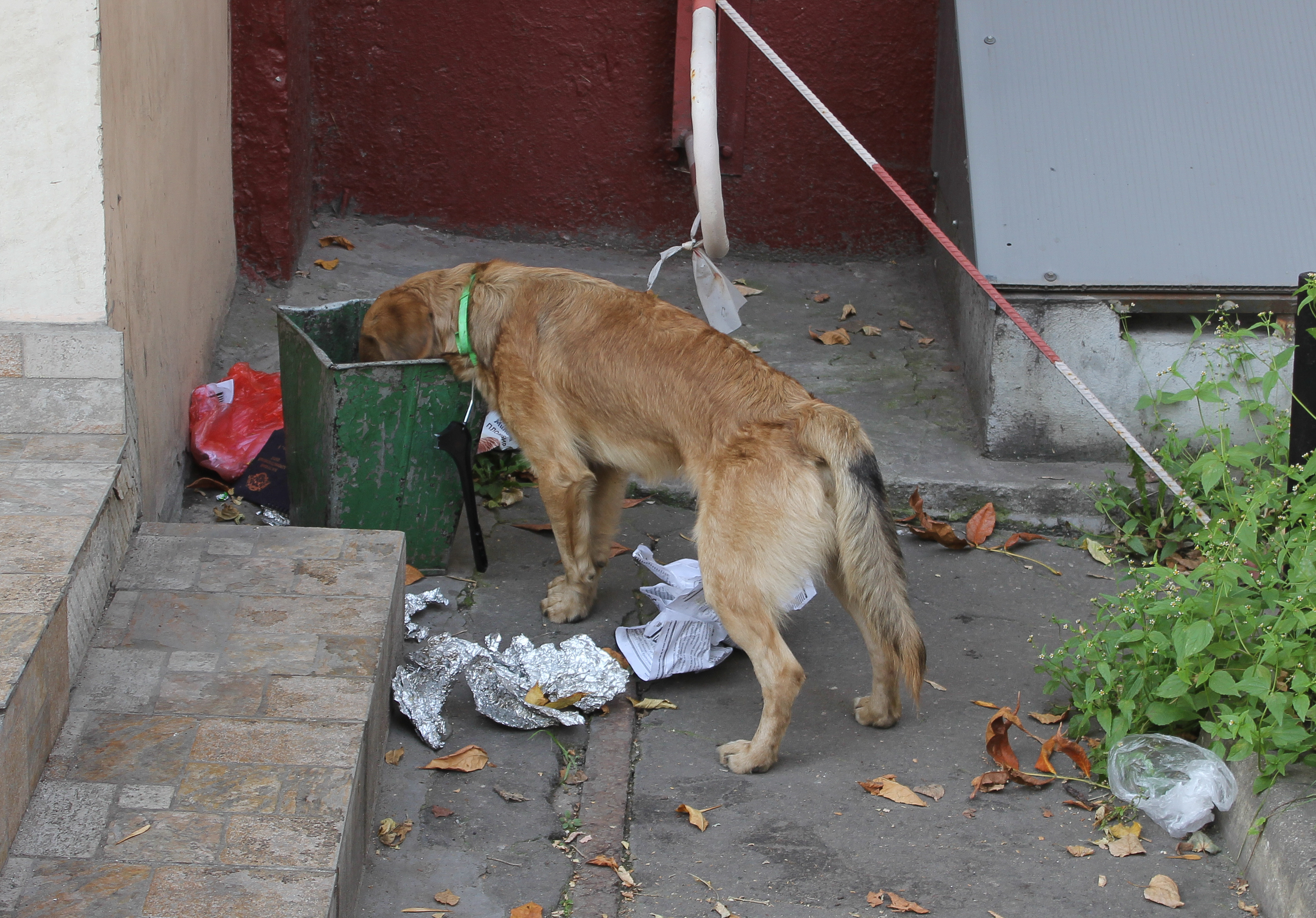
A lot of canines are poisoned due to human carelessness that could be easily avoided.

Food products and household items commonly handled by humans can be toxic to dogs. The symptoms can range from simple irritation to digestion issues, behavioral changes, and even death. The categories of common items ingested by dogs include food products, human medication, household detergents, indoor and outdoor toxic plants, and rat poison.

== Common signs of dog poisoning and exposure ==
The symptoms of poisoning vary depending on substance, the quantity a dog has consumed, the breed and size of the mammal. A common list of symptoms are digestion problems, such as vomiting, diarrhea, or blood in stool; bruising and bleeding gums, nose, or inside the ear canal; behavioral changes, such as lethargy, hyperactivity, and seizures; unusual items found in the dog's stool.

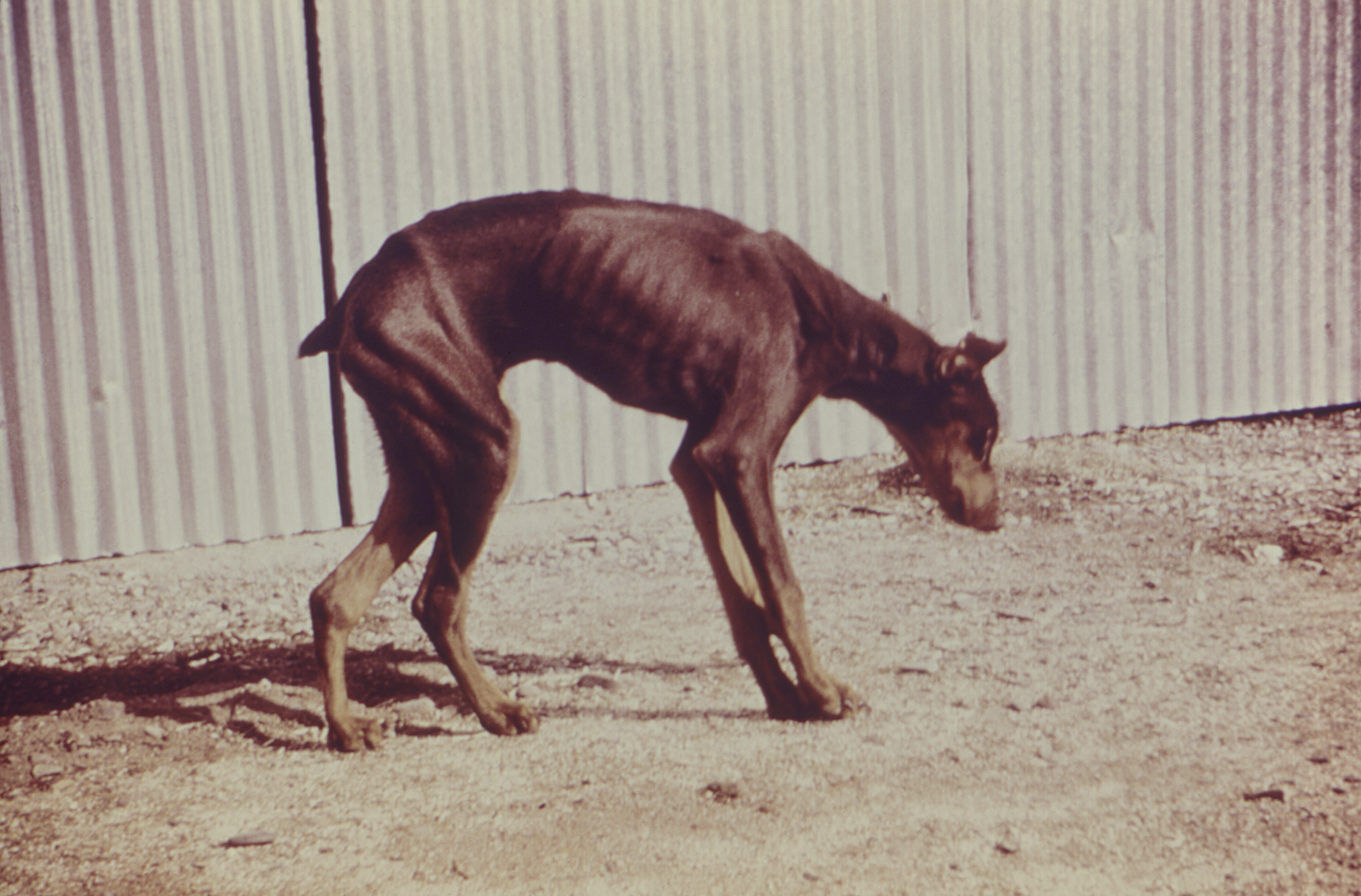
A dog showing signs of lethargy.

If left in the vicinity, poisonous items can be swallowed by curious or hungry dogs. Uninformed pet owners have also been found to unintentionally poison their dogs by treating them with human medications or feeding them foods they can't metabolize.

Some plants are toxic to dogs. Poisoning by contact happens most commonly with indoor plants when a dog gets the substance on their coat or muzzle. These can cause skin irritation and burns, but they can also become ingested when grooming.

Inhaled toxins, such as smoke or pesticides, can find their way into a dog's respiratory system and cause difficult breathing. If left untreated, these toxins can make their way to other organs of the body.

== Substances ==
=== Human food ===
Many human foods cause serious problems when ingested in large amounts. In 2011, the consumption of toxic foods was the number one cause of poisoning in dogs. In 2017, the ASPCA Animal Poison Control Center received 199,000 poisoning cases, almost one-fifth of which were the result of ingesting human foods.

==== Avocado ====
Avocados are known for having high amounts of persin, a chemical toxic to many animals, including dogs. Persin is found in the leaves, bark, pulp, and skin of the avocado, making it harder for dogs to ingest too much. However, high amounts of persin can cause an upset stomach in dogs, and eating large amounts of persin over a longer period of time has been known to cause heart failure in dogs. Large amounts of avocado flesh at once can cause vomiting and an upset stomach, and its high-fat content can cause pancreatitis in dogs.

==== Chocolate ====
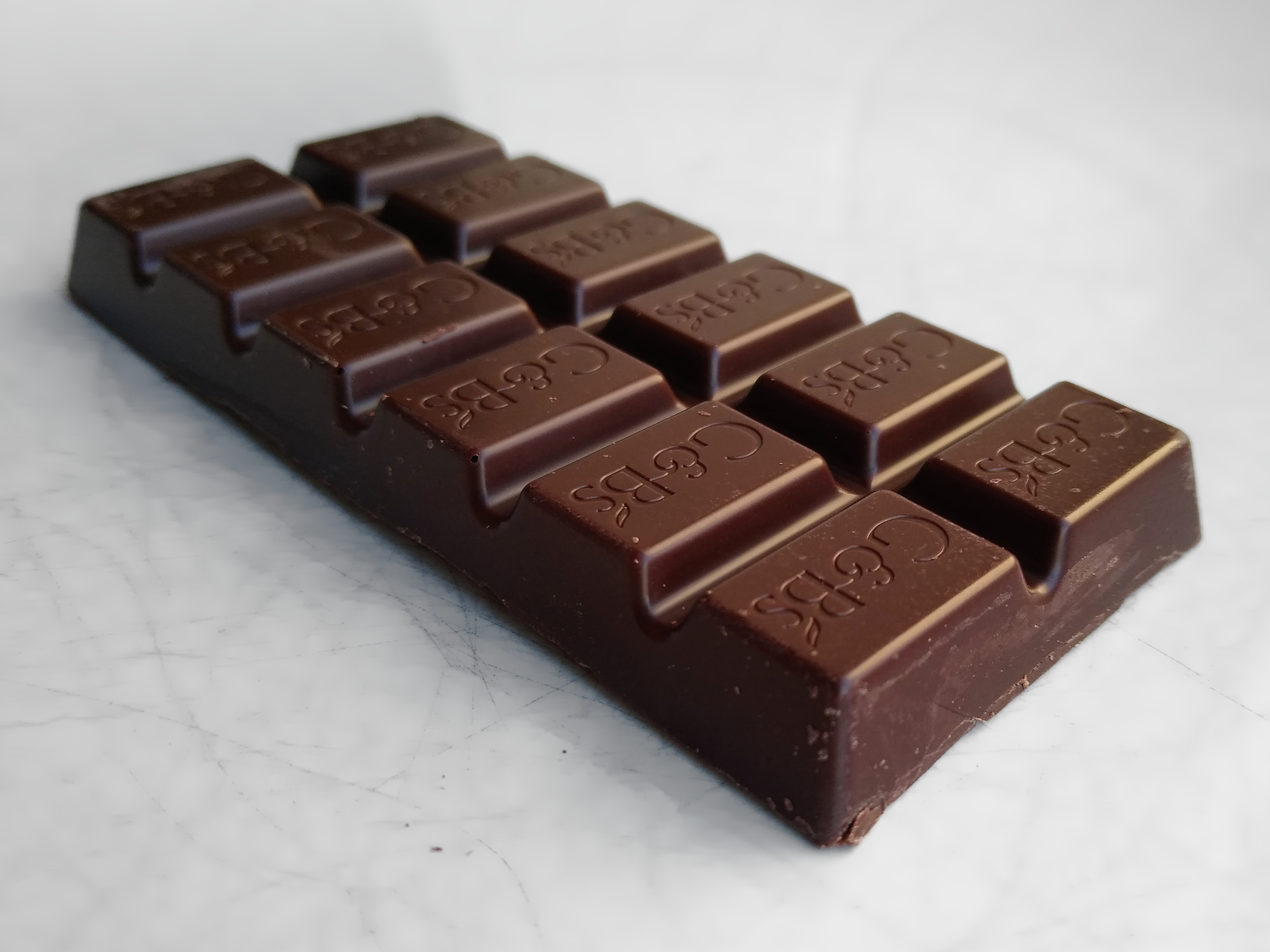
Chocolate, particularly dark chocolate, is toxic to dogs, due to its theobromine and caffeine content.

Chocolate is dangerous for dogs because they do not metabolise theobromine and caffeine, both present in chocolate, as effectively as humans. Darker chocolate and baking chocolate contain a higher amount of theobromine, thus they are more dangerous than milk chocolate or white chocolate. Small amounts of chocolate may cause vomiting or diarrhea, but larger amounts may affect the heart and brain. Large amounts of chocolate cause the dog to suffer irregular heart rhythms or heart failure.

Chocolate-style dog treats can be made with carob, which is similar to chocolate but innocuous to dogs.

==== Grapes, raisins, currants ====
These include any fruit of the Vitis species. It is unclear what substance within these fruits is toxic to dogs. There are several theories: mycotoxin, salicylate, or tartaric acid (including tartrates like potassium bitartrate), are all naturally found in grapes and decrease blood flow to the kidneys. There may be no dose information to show how much is too much. One dog may tolerate grapes or raisins better than another.

Cream of tartar and tamarind both cause a very similar toxic reaction. Both contain more tartaric acid than grapes and are hence more dangerous.

==== Macadamia nuts ====
Macadamia nuts have been included in the top foods to avoid feeding dogs. Like grapes or raisins, the substance of the nut responsible for negative reactions is unknown. Minuscule amounts of the nut can cause adverse reactions – "as little as 1/10th of an ounce per roughly 2 pounds of body weight." Macadamia nuts are singled out as having higher toxicity. Other nuts in general are high in fat and can cause a dog to become ill.

==== Xylitol ====
The U.S. Food and Drug Administration has issued alerts to notify the public that xylitol, a sugar substitute, is harmful to dogs. It is used in sugar-free foods including gum, candy, and oral hygiene products. Some peanut butter will also contain xylitol. Xylitol can cause liver failure and hypoglycemia because it stimulates rapid insulin production in the canine pancreas. Potential symptoms include loss of coordination, vomiting, or seizures. Xylitol is not always clearly labeled on sugar-free foods. Ingredient listings should indicate if xylitol is in the product. Food labels with the listing for "sugar alcohol" may contain xylitol. Other names for xylitol include birch sugar, E967, Meso-Xylitol, Xilitol, Xylit, 1, 2, 3, 4, 5-Pentol, and Sucre de Bouleau.

==== Fruit pits and seeds ====
Apples are safe for dogs, but apple seeds are not. Apple seeds, persimmon, peach, and plum pits, as well as other fruit seeds or pits have "cyanogenic glycosides". For example, if an apple seed skin is broken as a dog eats an apple, then cyanide could be released. Apple seeds should be removed before a dog eats the apple.

==== Onions and garlic ====
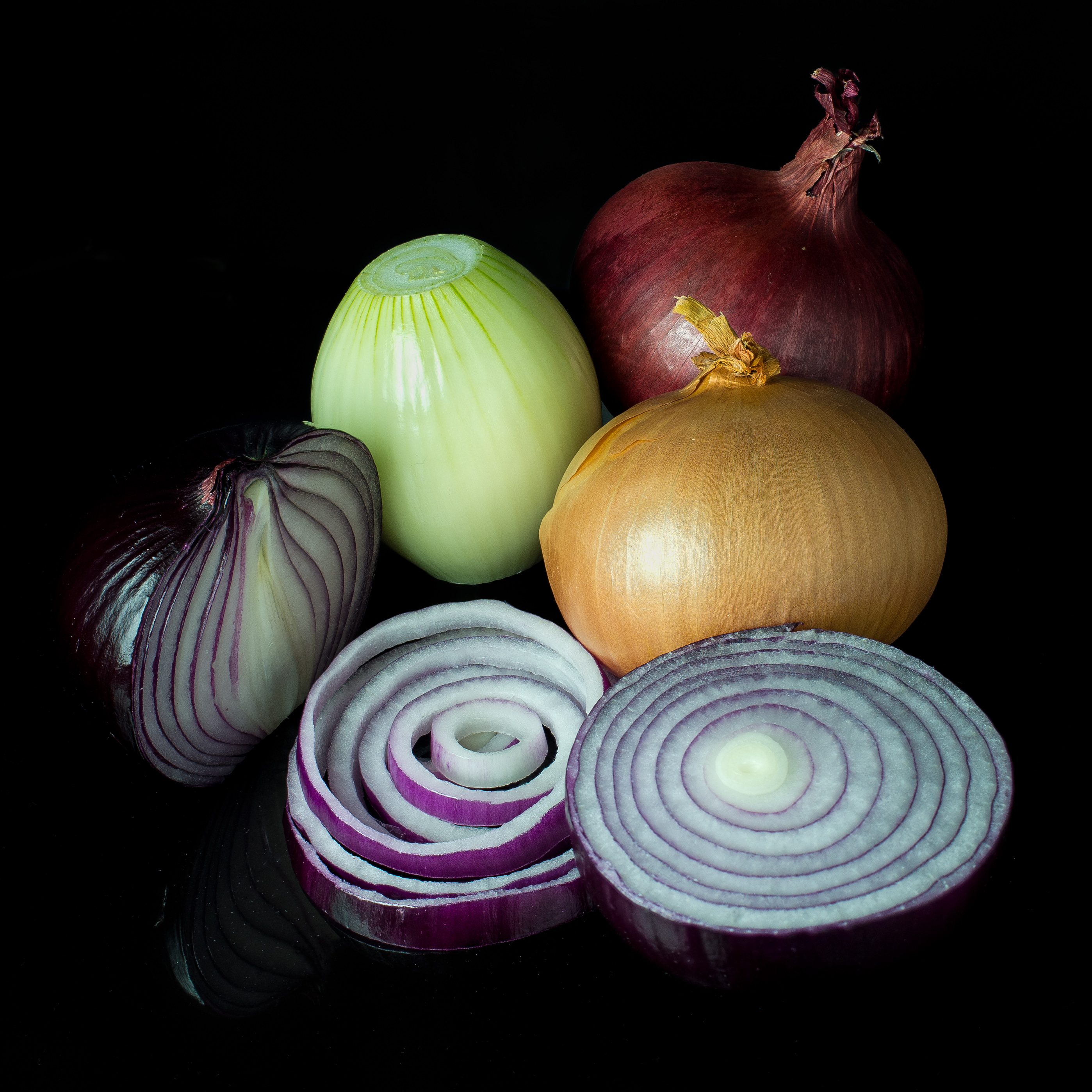
Members of the Onion family can be dangerous to dogs.

The Alliaceae family, of the Allium genus, or the onion family, includes onion, garlic, shallots, scallions, chives, and leeks. These contain N-propyl disulfide, Allyl propyl disulfide, and sodium N-propylthiosulfate which can cause red blood cell damage and anemia. Thiosulphate poisoning from onions can cause orange to dark-red tinged urine, vomiting, and diarrhea.

=== Medication ===
Human vitamin supplements can damage the digestive tract lining, especially those containing iron, and can lead to kidney and liver damage.

Ibuprofen and acetaminophen, commonly known as Motrin or Advil, and Tylenol, can cause liver damage in dogs. Human antidepressant drugs like Celexa can cause neurological problems in dogs.

ADHD medications contain stimulants, such as methylphenidate, that if ingested even in small amounts can be life-threatening to dogs. Examples are Concerta, Vyvanse, Adderall, and Dexadrine.

=== Household products ===
Many cases of pet poisoning in the United States are caused by household products.

Substances with a pH greater than 7 are considered alkalis. Usually, exposure causes some level of irritation. However, these substances generally have no taste or odor which increases the chance of larger amounts being ingested by a dog. At high levels of consumption, alkalis become a greater danger for dogs. Bleach, oven and drain/pipe cleaners, hair relaxers, and lye are examples of alkaline products.

Ethylene glycol, antifreeze, is extremely toxic to dogs. It has a sweet taste and thus dogs will drink it. As little as 2 1/2 tablespoons can kill a medium-sized dog in 2–3 days. This type of poisoning is often fatal as dog owners do not know their pet has ingested the antifreeze. De-icing fluids can also contain ethylene glycol.

Paraquat is used for weeding and grass control. It is so toxic that blue dye is added so it is not confused with coffee, a pungent odor is added as a warning, and a vomiting agent in case it is ingested. In the US, it can only be used by those with a commercial license for its use. It is one of the most commonly used herbicides worldwide. Outside of the US, the licensing requirements may not exist.

==== Pesticides ====
Pesticides containing organophosphates can be fatal to dogs. "Disulfoton is an example found in rose care products." "They're considered junior-strength nerve agents because they have the same mechanism of action as nerve gases like sarin", explained Dana Boyd Barr, an exposure scientist at Emory University in Atlanta, Georgia, who has studied organophosphate poisoning. Organophosphates are not banned from use but require licensing for use.

==== Rodenticides ====
Zinc phosphide is a common ingredient in rat poison or rodenticide. Zinc phosphide is a combination of phosphorus and zinc. If ingested, the acid in a dog's stomach turns the compound into phosphine, which is a toxic gas. The phosphine gas crosses into the dog's cells and causes the cell to die. Signs of poisoning include vomiting, anxiety, and loss of coordination. If a dog has not eaten and has an empty stomach when ingesting zinc phosphide, signs may not be apparent for up to 12 hours.

Strychnine is another rodenticide that is dangerous and causes similar reactions to zinc phosphide exposure. If a dog survives 24–48 hours after this type of poisoning, they generally recover well.

=== Veterinary products ===
Rimadyl, Dermaxx, and Previcox are types of non-steroidal anti-inflammatory drugs specifically for veterinary use for osteoarthritis, inflammation, and pain control in dogs. These can cause liver or kidney issues in dogs.

In most cases, issues of poisoning by veterinary products are due to incorrect administration or dosing by the veterinarian or the dog owner.

=== Plants ===
==== Daffodil ====
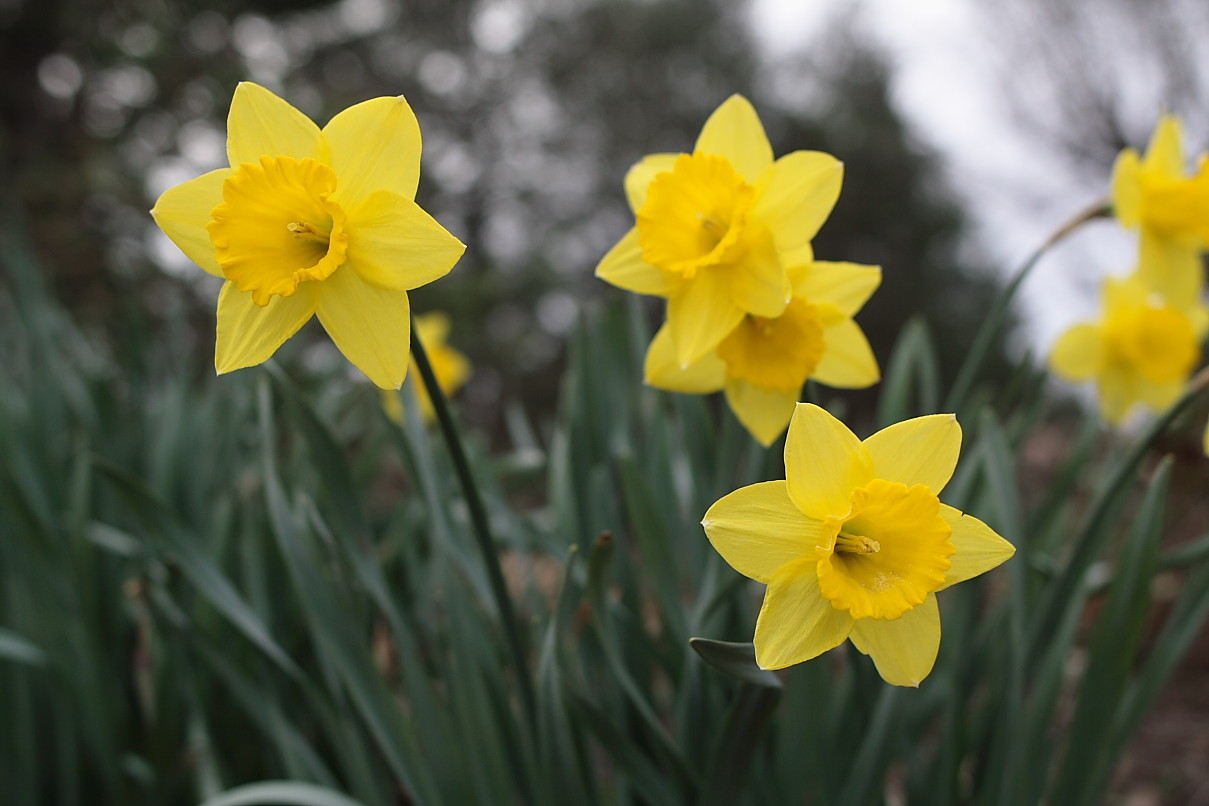
Daffodils can be various shades of yellow. Some can be mixed shades of yellow or yellow and orange.

Daffodils contain lycorine which can cause vomiting, drooling, diarrhea, stomachache, heart, and breathing issues. Any part of the plant may induce side effects, but the bulb is the most toxic. At higher amounts, the toxin can cause gastrointestinal problems or a drop in blood pressure.

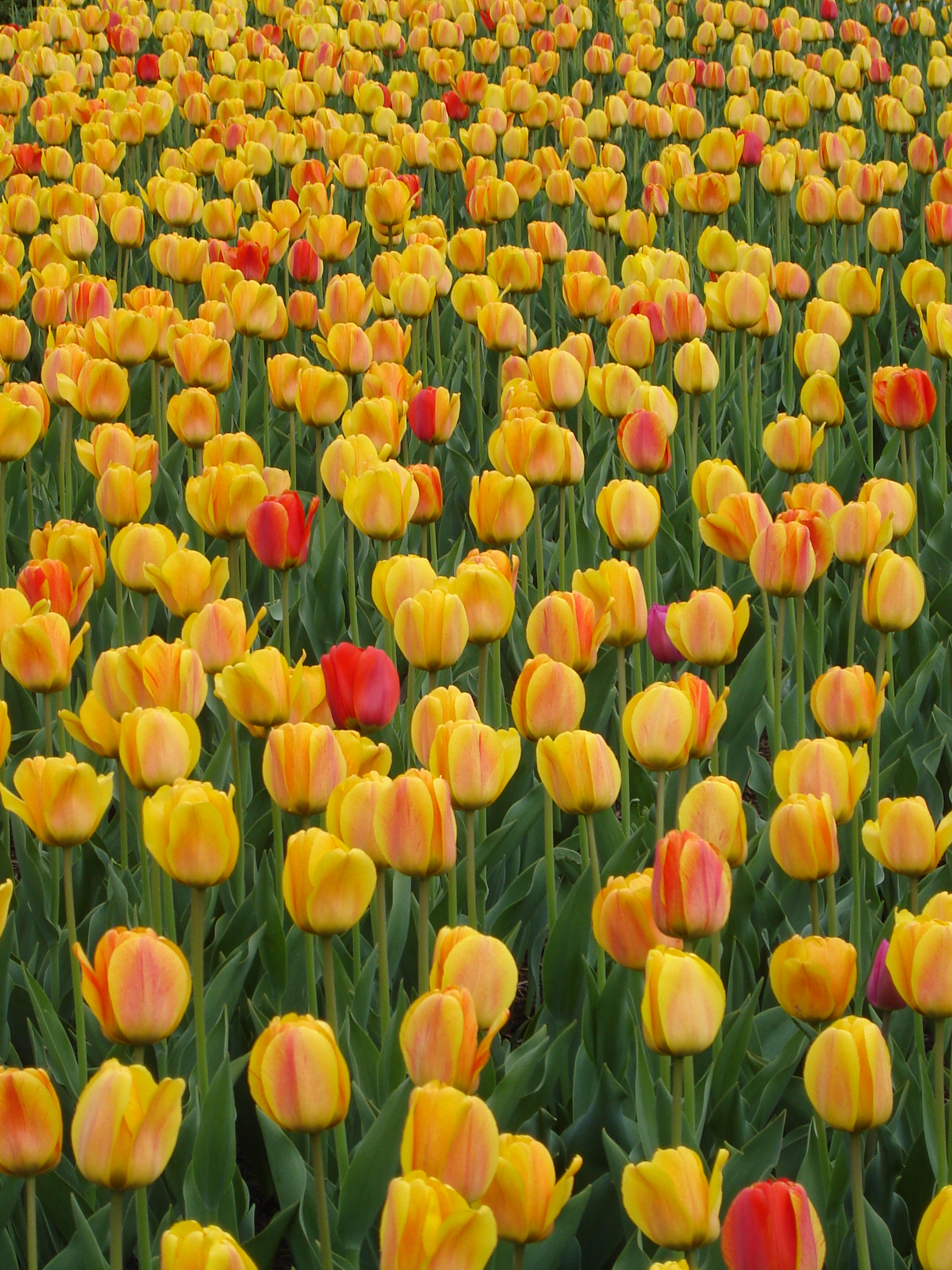
Tulips come in a variety of colors

Tulip

Any part of the tulip can be poisonous but the bulb is the most toxic causing irritation in the mouth and throat. Signs of this type of poisoning are drooling, vomiting, stomachache, and diarrhea.

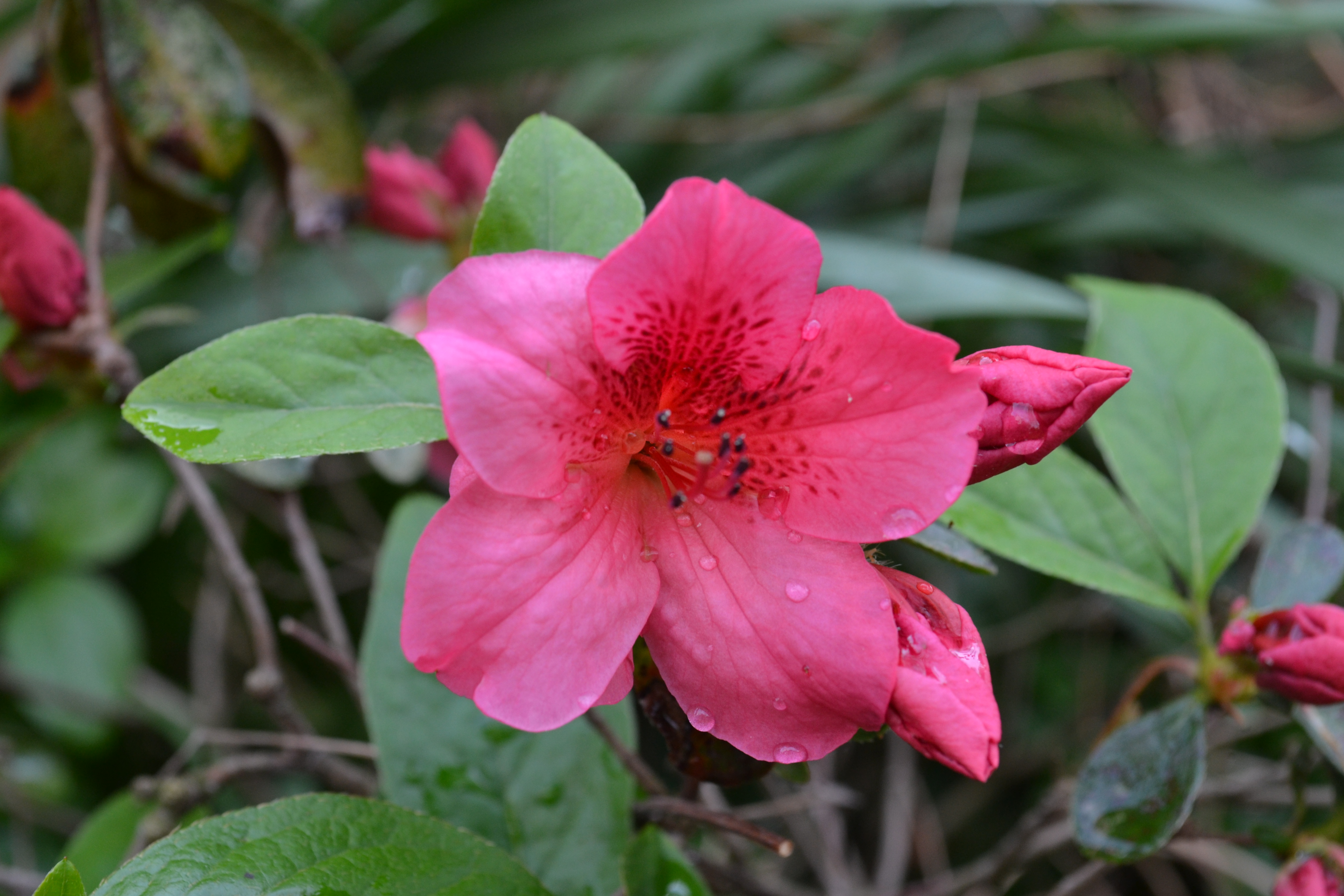
Azaleas come in a variety of pink, red, and purple as well as white. They can vary in size based on the variety and some have double blooms.

==== Azalea ====
Azaleas contain grayanotoxins. This toxin passes through the dog's body quickly and symptoms of vomiting, diarrhea, stomach pain, weakness, or abnormal heart rate usually subside in a few hours.

==== Oleander ====
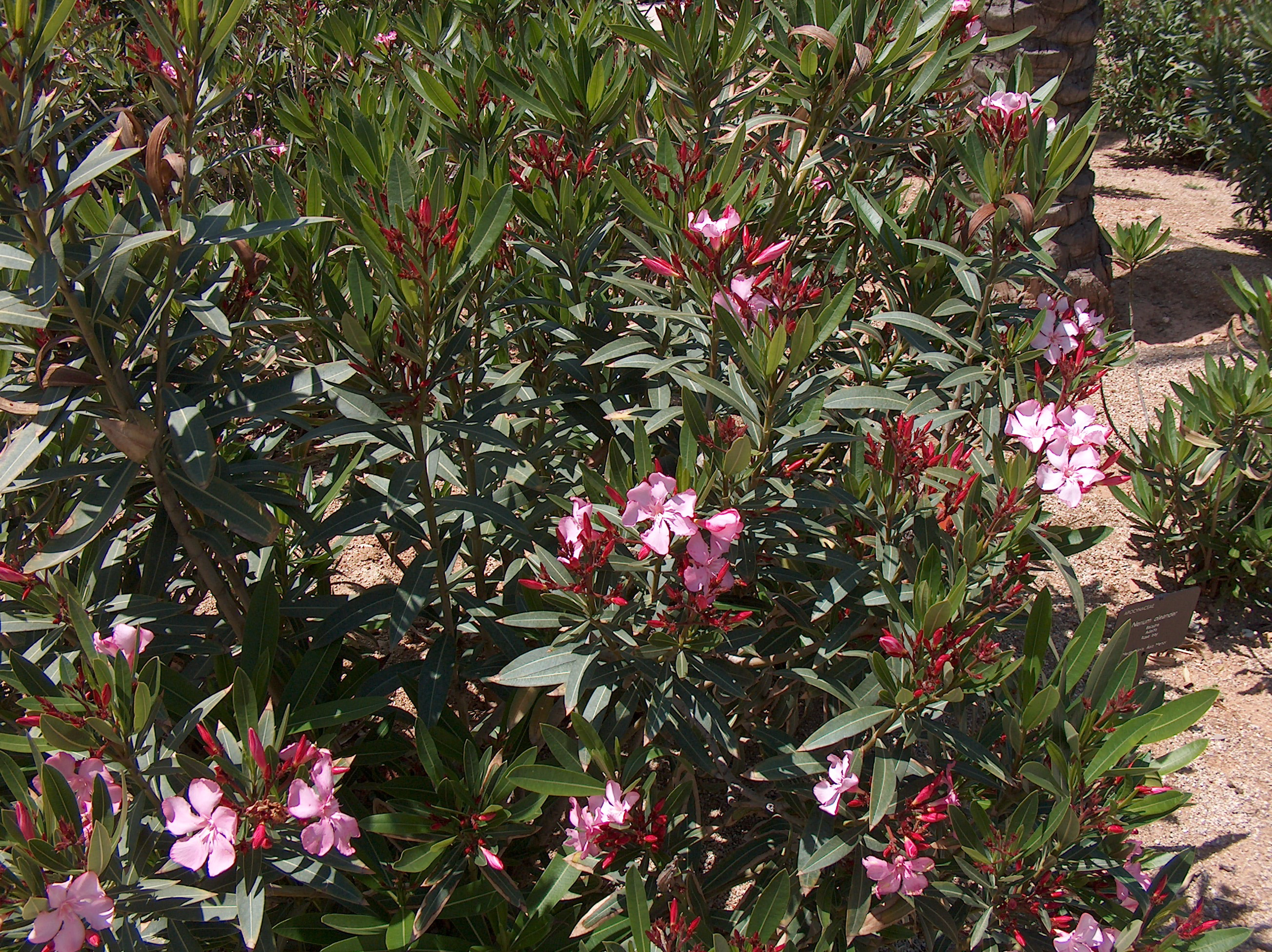
Oleander

Oleander contains cardiac glycosides oleandrin and nerioside. When ingested, they can result in fatal heart abnormalities, muscle tremors, ataxia, vomiting, and bloody diarrhea. The signs can start within a few hours and cause a dog's condition to decline quickly, thus treatment is often not successful.

==== Dieffenbachia ====
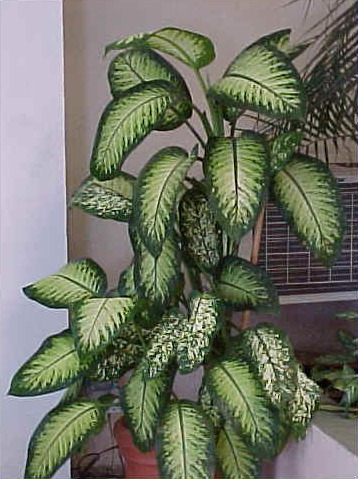
Dieffenbachia is a common indoor plant.

Dieffenbachia causes oral irritation, vomiting, and difficult swallowing in dogs. This plant contains calcium oxalate crystals. After ingestion, a dog may have a hard time swallowing and begin drooling or coughing as if choking. Dieffenbachia can cause damage to the liver and kidneys leading to death, comas, or permanent damage to critical organs, including the liver and kidneys, which may even lead to death.

==== Cycads, Sago palm ====
Sago palms and other cycads are toxic and potentially fatal to many animals, producing symptoms that include vomiting, diarrhea, seizures, neurological signs, and liver failure. The leaves and bark are both harmful, and the seeds (or "nuts") are even more toxic.

==== Cyclamen ====
Possibly all species of cyclamen are toxic to dogs. Cyclamen contains triterpenoid saponins that irritate skin.

==== Castor bean ====
Castor beans or the castor oil plant contain ricin which is toxic to dogs. It can be fatal depending on how much of the plant is ingested. The beans of the plant have a higher concentration of ricin and if chewed instead of swallowed whole will cause increased toxicity levels.

==== Hemlock ====
The USDA lists water hemlock as “the most violently toxic plant that grows in North America”. Dog deaths due to hemlock poisoning are unusual, and most animal deaths are cows or other grazing animals. If a dog does ingest hemlock, the cicutoxin in the plant can be fatal very quickly as it causes the heart and nervous system to not be able to function normally.

== Treatment and prognosis ==
There are many possible ways to handle a dog, depending on the severity of the issue, but one of the most important parts is timing. A dog that has been exposed to a toxic substance has a better chance of recovery if treatment is initiated quickly. With some things, like plants or detergents, if a dog shows signs of irritation, it may be simply enough to remove them from the dog's vicinity. Thorough washing with soap and water can usually prevent further absorption of poisons on the skin. In other cases, where the poisoning is more severe or the dog has swallowed something, taking it to a veterinarian quickly is vital.

Blood tests will then indicate enzyme levels from the liver and kidneys and bowel functions. They will also show levels of red and white blood cells and platelet levels. Just as in humans, there are established ranges for normal functions in dogs, and blood test results will indicate what may be wrong in a dog's body. Although it is always better if the substance is known right away.

A veterinarian can then determine further steps, such as inducing vomiting to remove that substance. Treatment for any swellings with antihistamines or other inflammatory drugs. In severe cases the dog may be put under anesthesia for their stomach to be flushed or surgery to be performed. if the poisonous substance cannot be physically removed, an activated charcoal solution is given to prevent absorption in the gastrointestinal tract. In the cases of poisons that cause liver damage, intravenous fluids assist in flushing toxins from the dog's body and may be combined with medications to help liver function.

Supportive treatment is often necessary until the poison can be metabolized. The type of support required depends on the animal's condition and may include controlling seizures, maintaining breathing with a ventilator, controlling heart problems, such as irregular heart beats and treating pain with pain medications. In some cases, there is a known antidote for a specific poison.
