= Poison shyness =

Avoidance of a known toxic substance

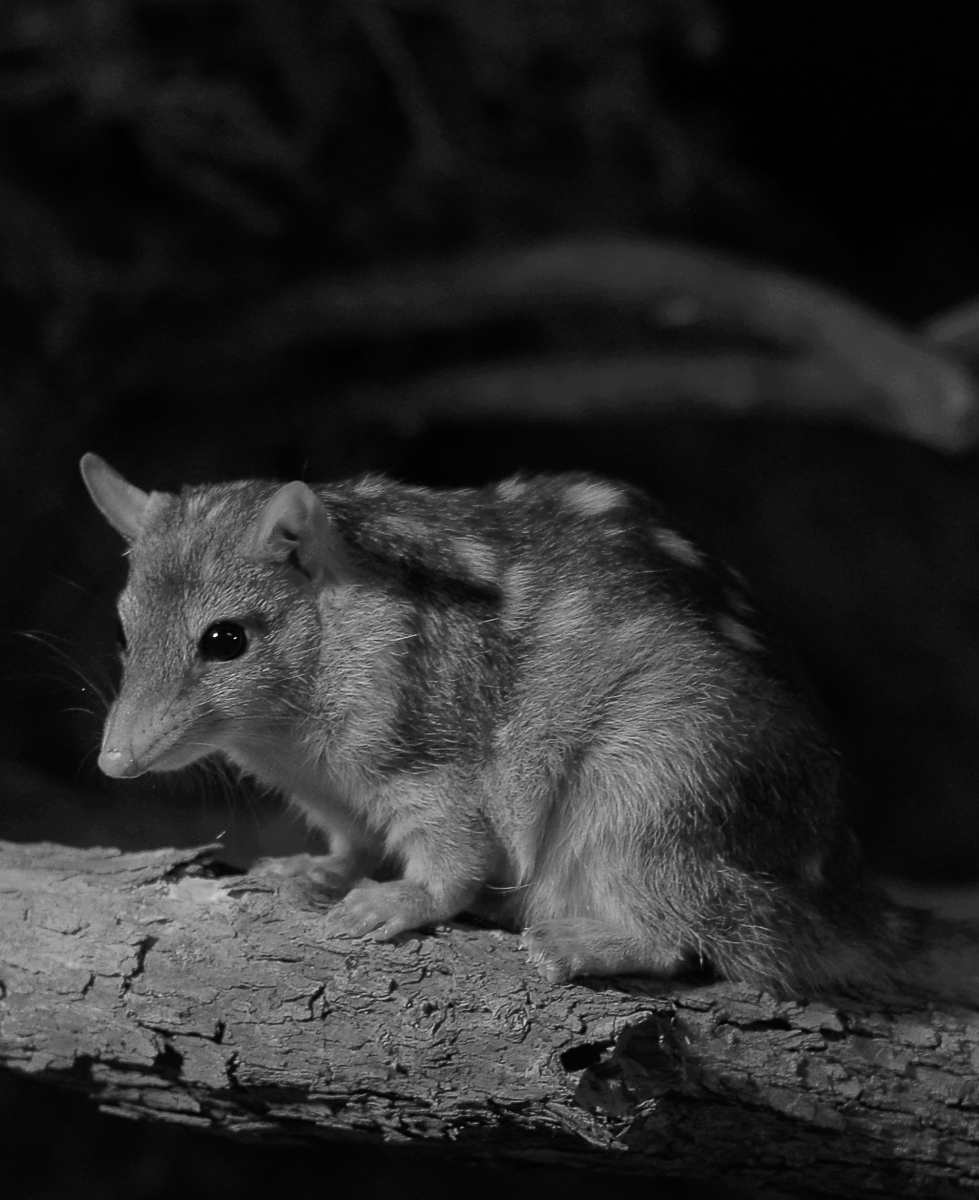
A northern quoll. A conditioned aversion to live toads in juvenile northern quolls was successfully established by feeding them a dead toad containing the nausea-inducing chemical thiabendazole.

Poison shyness, also called conditioned food aversion, is the avoidance of a toxic substance by an animal that has previously ingested that substance. Animals learn an association between stimulus characteristics, usually the taste or odor, of a toxic substance and the illness it produces; this allows them to detect and avoid the substance. Poison shyness occurs as an evolutionary adaptation in many animals, most prominently in generalists that feed on many different materials. It is often called bait shyness when it occurs during attempts at pest control of insects and animals. If the pest ingests the poison bait at sublethal doses, it typically detects and avoids the bait, rendering the bait ineffective.

== In nature ==
For any organism to survive, it must have adaptive mechanisms to avoid toxicosis. In mammals, a variety of behavioral and physiological mechanisms have been identified that allow them to avoid being poisoned. First, there are innate rejection mechanisms such as the rejection of toxic materials that taste bitter. Second, there are other physiologically adaptive responses such as vomiting or alterations in the digestion and processing of toxic materials. Third, there are learned aversions to distinctive foods if ingestion is followed by illness.

A typical experiment tested food aversion learning in squirrel monkeys (Saimiri sciureus) and common marmosets (Callithrix jacchus), using several kinds of cues. Both species showed one-trial learning with the visual cues of color and shape, whereas only the marmosets did so with an olfactory cue. Both species showed a tendency for quicker acquisition of the association with visual cues than with the olfactory cue. All individuals from both species were able to remember the significance of the visual cues, color and shape, even after 4 months. However, illness was not necessarily prerequisite for food avoidance learning in these species, for highly concentrated but non-toxic bitter and sour tastes also induced robust taste aversion learning and retention.

The nematode C. elegans was shown to learn and transmit to their offspring avoidance after exposure to non-coding RNA of a bacterial pathogen.

== In pest control and conservation ==
Conditioned taste aversion has been widely used as a method of pest control and conservation. These aversions have been induced in both predator and prey species.

=== Examples ===
Rodents: Rats and mice develop bait shyness very readily; it can persist for weeks or months and may be transferred to nontoxic foods of similar types. Thus, if poisons are used for control they must provide no sensation of illness after ingestion. For this purpose, baits containing anticoagulants such as Warfarin were long used; they kill relatively slowly through internal bleeding, which is not associated with ingestion. More recently a highly potent toxin attacking the central nervous system, bromethalin, has been used. Again, with sub-lethal doses of this chemical, the animal cannot learn the association between the odour of the food and its toxicity, thereby preventing poison shyness from developing.

Crows: Conditioned taste aversion has been used to control crow (Corvus brachyrhynchos) predation on eggs – a problem for bird sanctuaries and farmers with outdoor chickens. The researchers put a sickness-causing agent in several eggs, painted them green and then placed them where crows could eat them. After eating the tainted eggs, the crows avoided eating green eggs. The crows subsequently avoided eating green eggs whether they contained toxin or not. The crows also continued to eat unpainted and non-toxic chicken eggs. However, another study tested if carrion crow (Corvus corone) predation on little tern (Sterna albifrons) eggs could be decreased by conditioned taste aversion. The study failed to find an effect because the crows were able to distinguish treated eggs during handling, without consuming a significant amount of the illness-inducing compound. House crows are reported to develop bait shyness if quick-acting toxicants are used to reduce their population.

Quoll: In Australia, a critically endangered predator, the northern quoll (Dasyurus hallucatus) is threatened by the invasion of the highly toxic cane toad (Bufo marinus). After toad invasion, quoll populations have become extinct across Northern Australia. A conditioned aversion to live toads in juvenile northern quolls was successfully established by feeding them a dead toad containing a nausea-inducing chemical (thiabendazole).

Multiple predators: When surrogate eggs of the sandhill crane (Grus canadensis) were laced with an illness-producing substance, egg predation decreased in a location which contained multiple potential predators.

Coyotes: Poisoned baits of meat left where coyotes can find them have been used to discourage coyotes from attacking sheep. Here, bait shyness is transferred from the pieces of meat to an aversion for live sheep. Bait shyness may sometimes be location specific and not transferred to different localities.

== Livestock protection ==
Taste aversions have been developed in wolves, coyotes, and other canids to protect livestock and vulnerable wildlife. In 1974, it was reported that coyotes (Canis latrans) learned to avoid hamburger after eating hamburger treated with lithium chloride and could transfer such a drug-induced aversion of LiCl-tainted sheep or rabbit (Sylvilagus sp.) flesh to the corresponding live prey. Olfactory (cologne) and visual (a red collar on the sheep) cues increased the suppression of predation through conditioned learned aversion in coyotes, although this was for a limited duration.

Grazing livestock frequently eat poisonous plants, and death often results. Behavioral adjustments by conditioned taste aversions may protect animals from over-ingestion of toxic plants. Three species of plants with different mechanisms of toxicity were tested for their ability to condition a taste aversion in sheep. Only woody aster conditioned a taste aversion indicating that conditioned aversions to selenium-containing plants help deter consumption of such plants by grazing ruminants.

== Crop protection ==
The cultivation of woody plants (olive trees, grapevines, fruit trees, etc.) can benefit from having animals e.g. sheep and goats, grazing the same area as their faeces nourish the soil thereby reducing the use of herbicides and fertilisers. However, these same animals sometimes eat the crops. Lithium chloride has been used to develop conditioned taste aversion to olive leaves and shoots in sheep and goats.

== List of animals ==
Below is an incomplete list of animals for which poison shyness or bait shyness has been documented in pest control:

- Rats
  - Nile rat
  - Laboratory rat
- Possums
  - Brushtail possum (Trichosurus vulpecula)
- Moles
- Voles
- Mice
  - House mice
  - Deer mice (Peromyscus maniculatus)
- Coyotes (Canis latrans)
- Crows
  - Carrion crows
- Ravens

== See also ==
- Conditioned taste aversion
- Vaccine hesitancy
