= Phosacetim =

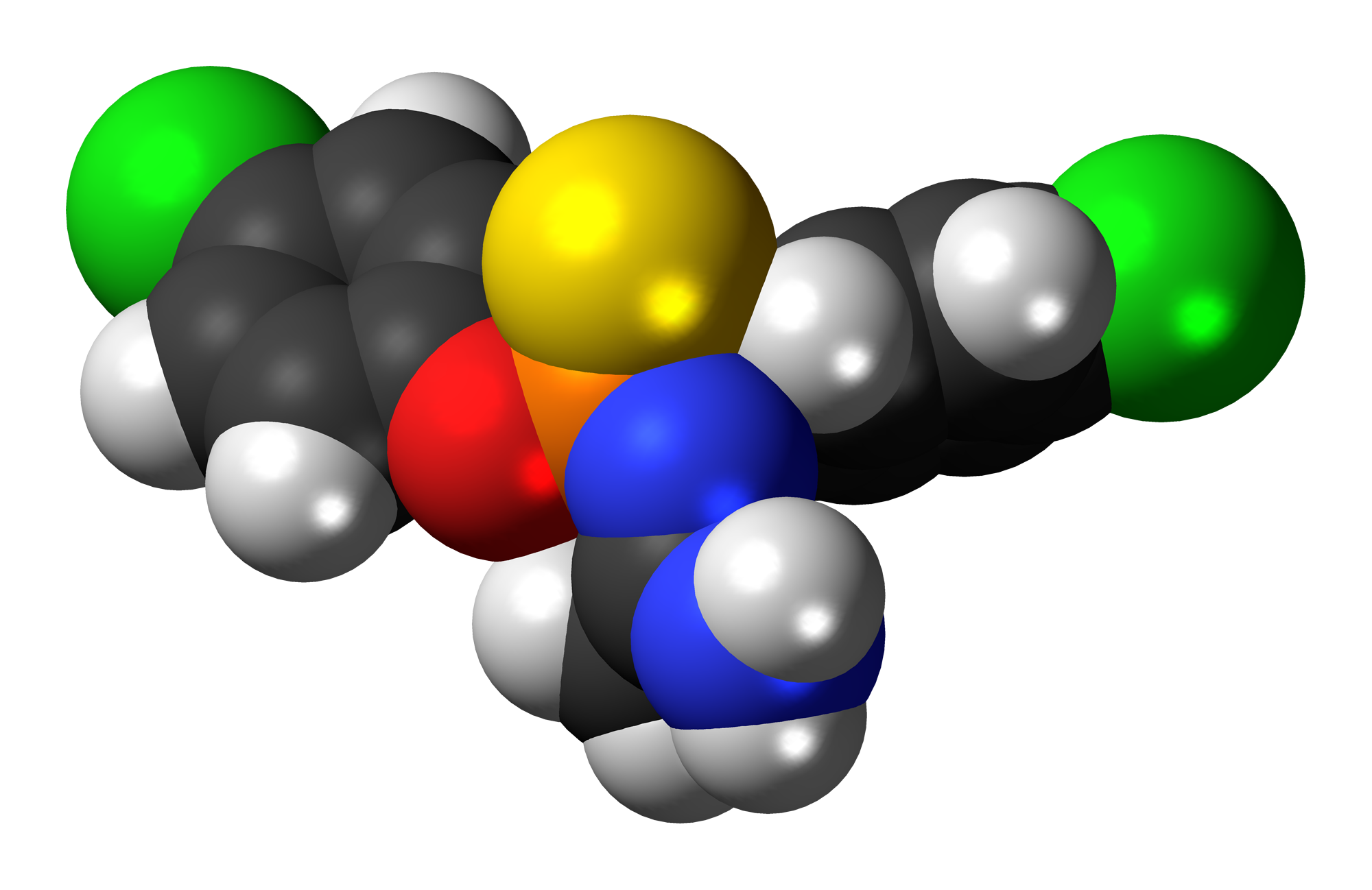

Names
- IUPAC name N'-[Bis(4-chlorophenoxy)phosphorothioyl]ethanimidamide

Identifiers
CAS Number	4104-14-7
3D model (JSmol)	Interactive image
ChemSpider	7844636
ECHA InfoCard	100.021.704
KEGG	C19140
PubChem CID	9570168
UNII	7B08Z34L7O
CompTox Dashboard (EPA)	DTXSID5040330
- InChI: InChI=1S/C14H13Cl2N2O2PS/c1-10(17)18-21(22,19-13-6-2-11(15)3-7-13)20-14-8-4-12(16)5-9-14/h2-9H,1H3,(H2,17,18,22) Key: XIBXUAZIZXDFTG-UHFFFAOYSA-N; InChI=1/C14H13Cl2N2O2PS/c1-10(17)18-21(22,19-13-6-2-11(15)3-7-13)20-14-8-4-12(16)5-9-14/h2-9H,1H3,(H2,17,18,22) Key: XIBXUAZIZXDFTG-UHFFFAOYAC
- SMILES: C/C(=N\P(=S)(OC1=CC=C(C=C1)Cl)OC2=CC=C(C=C2)Cl)N

Properties
Chemical formula	C_{14}H_{13}Cl_{2}N_{2}O_{2}PS
Molar mass	375.210

Hazards
- Occupational safety and health (OHS/OSH)
Main hazards	Toxic
- Except where otherwise noted, data are given for materials in their standard state (at 25 °C [77 °F], 100 kPa). verify (what is ?) Infobox references

Phosacetim is a toxic organophosphate compound, which acts as an acetylcholinesterase inhibitor and is used as a rodenticide.
