= Difethialone =

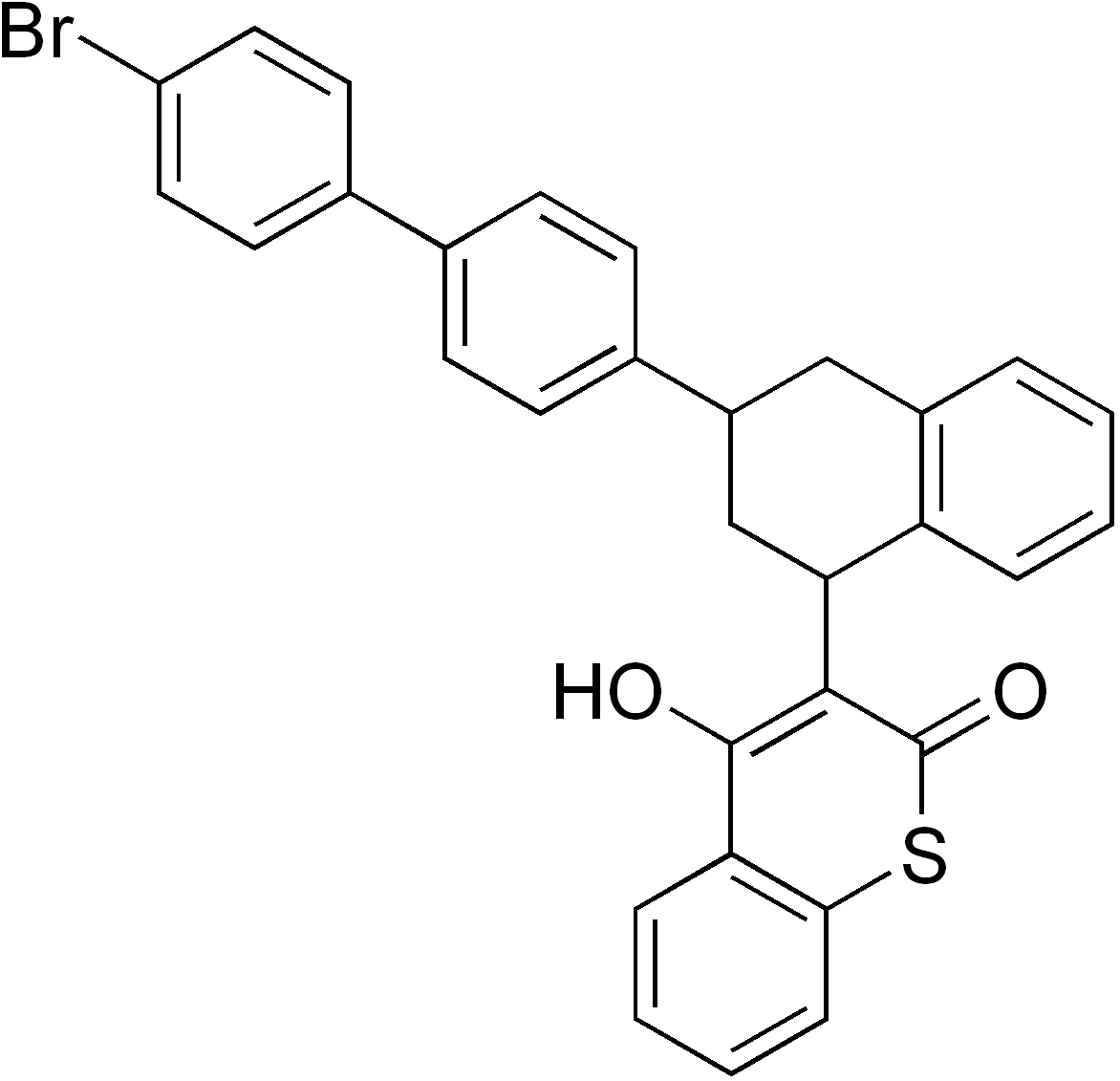

Names
- Preferred IUPAC name 3-[3-(4′-Bromo[1,1′-biphenyl]-4-yl)naphthalen-1-yl]-4-hydroxy-2H-1-benzothiopyran-2-one

Identifiers
CAS Number	104653-34-1
3D model (JSmol)	Interactive image
ChemSpider	10469311
ECHA InfoCard	100.118.383
KEGG	C18695
PubChem CID	91771
UNII	KOL4VXI5O0
CompTox Dashboard (EPA)	DTXSID4032374
- InChI: InChI=1S/C31H23BrO2S/c32-24-15-13-20(14-16-24)19-9-11-21(12-10-19)23-17-22-5-1-2-6-25(22)27(18-23)29-30(33)26-7-3-4-8-28(26)35-31(29)34/h1-16,23,27,33H,17-18H2 Key: JHELOZJAKXYVBE-UHFFFAOYSA-N; InChI=1/C31H23BrO2S/c32-24-15-13-20(14-16-24)19-9-11-21(12-10-19)23-17-22-5-1-2-6-25(22)27(18-23)29-30(33)26-7-3-4-8-28(26)35-31(29)34/h1-16,23,27,33H,17-18H2 Key: JHELOZJAKXYVBE-UHFFFAOYAX
- SMILES: O=c1c(C2CC(c3ccc(-c4ccc(Br)cc4)cc3)Cc3ccccc32)c(O)sc2ccccc12

Properties
Chemical formula	C_{31}H_{23}BrO_{2}S
Molar mass	539.49 g·mol^{−1}
- Except where otherwise noted, data are given for materials in their standard state (at 25 °C [77 °F], 100 kPa). verify (what is ?) Infobox references

Difethialone is an vitamin K antagonist anticoagulant used as a rodenticide. It is considered a second generation agent.

It belongs to the 4-thiochromenone or benzothiopyranone class of rodenticides, which differs from 4-hydroxycoumarins by the substitution of an oxygen atom with sulfur. It is especially similar to brodifacoum. It shares the same mechanism of inhibiting Vkorc1. It is effective for warfarin-resistant and warfarin-susceptible rodents. Its high potency makes resistance harder to evolve, though a few populations of rodents have nevertheless managed to do so.

In May 2008, the Environmental Protection Agency (EPA) added restrictions on the sale of difethialone in consumer-use rodenticide products and also for exterior use by commercial applicators.

== Regulations ==
The EPA began analyzing anticoagulant-based rodenticide products (AR) in the 1990s. The results were published in 1998 "in the Registration Eligibility Decision (RED) rodenticide cluster (US EPA 1998)." Difethialone was classified as suitable for registration. A further in-depth environmental risk assessment using the "stochastic risk assessed method" targeted the nine active ingredients in rodenticides. Products containing difethialone were identified as hazardous to non-target animals. In 2008, to protect children and prevent animal exposure, the EPA published its final decision. California further restricted the use of difethialone. "Assembly Bill No. 2657 prohibits the use of brodifacoum, bromadiolone, difenacoum, and difethialone in 'wildlife habitat areas,'" and "Assembly Bill 2596" prohibits their use in the state, with an exemption for agricultural use.

In the EU, rodenticides are regulated as pesticides when used to protect growing or stored crops, and as biocides when used to protect processed agricultural produce stored in farm buildings. The EU, however, still allows the use of ARs; however, manufacturers of difethialone have not sought authorization for crop protection.

In Australia, difethialone is classified as a Schedule 6 anticoagulant rodenticide. "Schedule 6. – Poison – Substances with a moderate potential for causing harm, the extent of which can be reduced through the use of distinctive packaging with strong warnings and safety directions on the label." The sale and use of difethialone is legal according to the Australian Government Department of Health, Therapeutic Goods Administration, 2017.
