= Fudan poisoning case =

2013 poisoning case in Shanghai, China

The Fudan poisoning case was a criminal case in China. Lin Senhao, a graduate student at Shanghai Medical College of Fudan University, was accused of murdering his roommate Huang Yang by poisoning him with N-nitrosodimethylamine that he mixed into the water fountain at the dormitory, later claiming it was only supposed to be a prank. He was tried from 2013 to 2015. Lin was executed on December 11, 2015, after he was convicted and sentenced to death.

This case was debated in Chinese jurisprudential circles and was a popular topic at the time of the trial, with regards to whether the accused had simply intended to injure the victim or planned to kill him.

== Background ==
=== Relationship ===
Lin Senhao and Huang Yang were both graduate students at the medical school of Fudan University. Lin began living in dormitory room 421 in August 2010. One year later, Huang Yang became Lin's roommate. While living together, Lin became angry with Huang over disagreements and gradually developed a grudge against him.

On March 29, 2013, Lin heard that Huang Yang and his classmates wanted to play April Fools' Day pranks on their fellow students. Lin later stated that he only wanted to make Huang Yang sick through poisoning as a prank.

=== Motivation and poisoning ===
The Supreme People's Court confirmed these findings in its review of the trial: Lin and Huang were graduate students of the same university; they lived in the same dormitory room; Lin was angry with Huang because of trifles; Lin decided to use poison to harm his roommate.

On November 27, 2013, in the Shanghai No. 2 Intermediate People's Court, Lin Senhao testified that 8 months earlier on March 31, 2013, he asked his classmate Lü Peng for N-nitrosodimethylamine, explaining he needed it for an experiment. Lü Peng gave Lin the key to the laboratory in which the chemical was stored. Lin then went to the laboratory and took both a bottle containing 75 ml of a reagent, and a syringe containing approximately 2 ml of N-nitrosodimethylamine.

Prosecutors accused Lin of infusing at least 30 ml of N-nitrosodimethylamine into the dormitory water dispenser, more than 10 times the lethal dose for humans.

== Case ==
=== Theft of the N-nitrosodimethylamine ===
On the afternoon of March 31, 2013, Lin borrowed the key from another person and accessed 204 imaging medical laboratory, building 11 of Zhongshan Hospital affiliated with Fudan University. Lin located and stole the reagent bottle containing N-nitrosodimethylamine, as well as several syringes which had previously been used to conduct animal testing with the compound, sneaking them out of the laboratory by placing them into a yellow waste bag.

=== Police investigation and arrest ===
On April 11, 2013, the cultural security bureau of the municipal public security bureau responded to Huang's sickness. Police immediately organized a task force to conduct an investigation.

About 0:00 on April 12, 2013, after the police determined that Lin was a suspect and summoned him, Lin then confessed that he had put N-nitrosodimethylamine in dorm 421's water dispenser.

On April 12, 2013, Lin was detained by the police. 4 days later, Huang Yang died at 3:23 pm after attempts to revive him failed. After authentication by forensics, it was determined that acute liver necrosis caused by N-nitrosodimethylamine poisoning caused his death from multiple organ failure, including liver, kidney and lungs.

On April 19, 2013, Shanghai police charged the procuratorate with the arrest of a suspect, Lin, of the "4·1" case of Fudan University. On April 25, the Huangpu district procuratorate gave permission to arrest Lin as a suspect in the "4·1".

=== Prosecution ===
On October 30, 2013, Shanghai No. 2 Intermediate People's Court received the prosecution of the suspect Lin. The prosecution accused Lin of the crime of intentional homicide using poison.

== Judicial proceedings ==
=== Shanghai No. 2 Intermediate People's Court ===
At 9:30 AM on November 27, 2013, Shanghai No. 2 Intermediate People's Court held a public hearing of the "Fudan poisoning case". In the hearing, the prosecutor alleged that Lin intentionally murdered Huang. They stated that the means were cruel, and the social harm was heavy. Lin's acts constituted intentional homicide, so prosecutors asked the court for a heavy punishment.

The defendant argued that the motivation of poisoning was just to prank Huang on April Fool's Day and that he had no intent to kill Huang Yang. Defenders had no objection to the indictment, but put forward that Lin had committed indirect intentional homicide, and had confessed guilt, so he should be given a lighter punishment in accordance with the law.

At 6:15 PM on November 27, 2013, the hearing ended. On February 18, 2014, Lin was sentenced to the death penalty for intentional homicide, and denied political rights for life.

=== Shanghai High People's Court ===
On February 25, 2014, Lin's lawyer, Tang Zhijian, was formally appointed by Lin to appeal. On January 8, 2015, Shanghai High People's Court affirmed the original judgment of Lin poisoning case. The second-instance court did not accept the defendant's contention, and said that although Lin confessed the guilt after arrest, his means of killing were cruel and the consequences were serious. The second-instance reaffirmed the death penalty for intentional homicide. According to Criminal Procedure Law, the death penalty sentence was submitted to the Supreme People's Court for approval.

=== Supreme People's Court ===
On May 26, 2015, the Supreme People's Court heard Lin's defence contention. The defence claimed that the second-instance court's sentencing was too heavy. The judge of The Supreme People's Court ordered the case be reviewed in accordance with the law.

On December 9, the result of the review was released – the Supreme People's Court approved Lin Senhao's death penalty verdict.

== Details ==
=== Meeting between the Supreme Court judge and Lin's father ===
According to defence lawyer Xie Tongxiang, the chief justice agreed to meet the defendant's father, Lin Zunyao, on July 28, 2015. Lin Zunyao and the chief justice discussed the case in the courtroom of the Supreme People's Court. According to Lin Zunyao, this meeting lasted for hours, and the judge and the clerk made a detailed record.

The lawyer, Xie Tongxiang, claimed that no precedent allowed the chief justice to meet a defendant's relatives, and that "This is the first time since The Supreme People's Court has repossessed the right to review the death penalty, the judges of the death penalty have met directly with the relatives in the courtroom."

=== Death penalty confirmed ===
On December 10, 2015, Lin Zunyao said he received a notification from the court that the death penalty verdict had been approved.

Lin Zunyao said: "My heart breaks, I can't think now." He was told by the Supreme People's Court that he must go to see his son before December 11.

Xie said that he would submit a written application to help Lin Senhao apply for a pretest, as a final appeal against the verdict.

Lin Senhao was executed by lethal injection on December 11, 2015.
