= Rat Ice =

Type of dry ice used to suffocate rat nests

Rat Ice is a trademarked version of dry ice approved by the U.S. Environmental Protection Agency for use in suffocating rat nests. The trademark is owned by Bell Laboratories, Inc. of Windsor, Wisconsin.
