= Rodenticide =

Chemical used to kill rodents

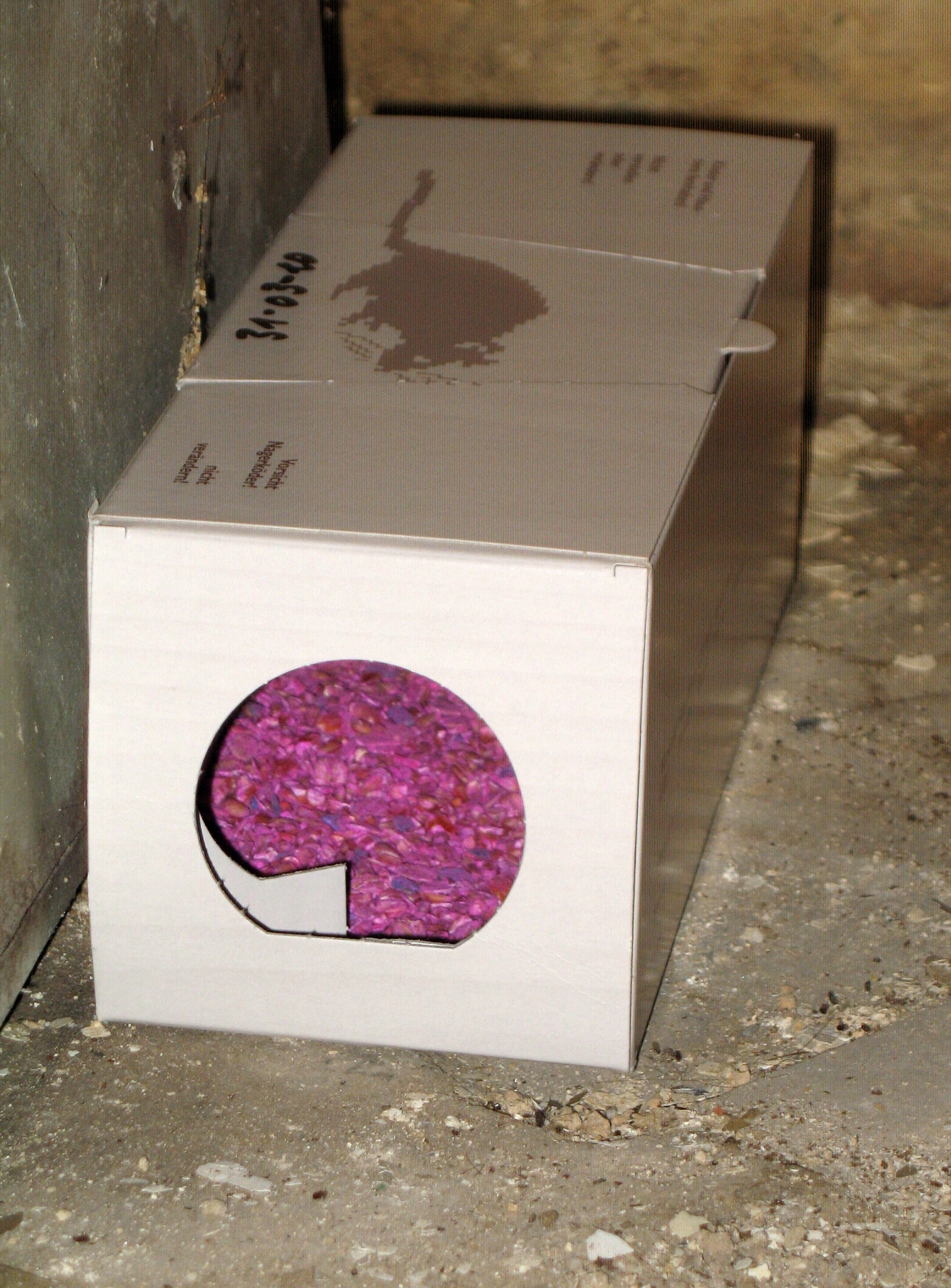
Typical rat poison bait station (Germany, 2010)

Rodenticides are chemicals made and sold for the purpose of killing rodents. While commonly referred to as "rat poison", rodenticides are also used to kill mice, woodchucks, chipmunks, porcupines, nutria, beavers, and voles.

Some rodenticides are lethal after one exposure while others require more than one. Rodents are disinclined to gorge on an unknown food (perhaps reflecting an adaptation to their inability to vomit), preferring to sample, wait and observe whether it makes them or other rats sick. This phenomenon of poison shyness is the rationale for poisons that kill only after multiple doses.

Besides being directly toxic to the mammals that ingest them, including dogs, cats, and humans, many rodenticides present a secondary poisoning risk to animals that hunt or scavenge the rats' corpses.

== Classes of rodenticides ==
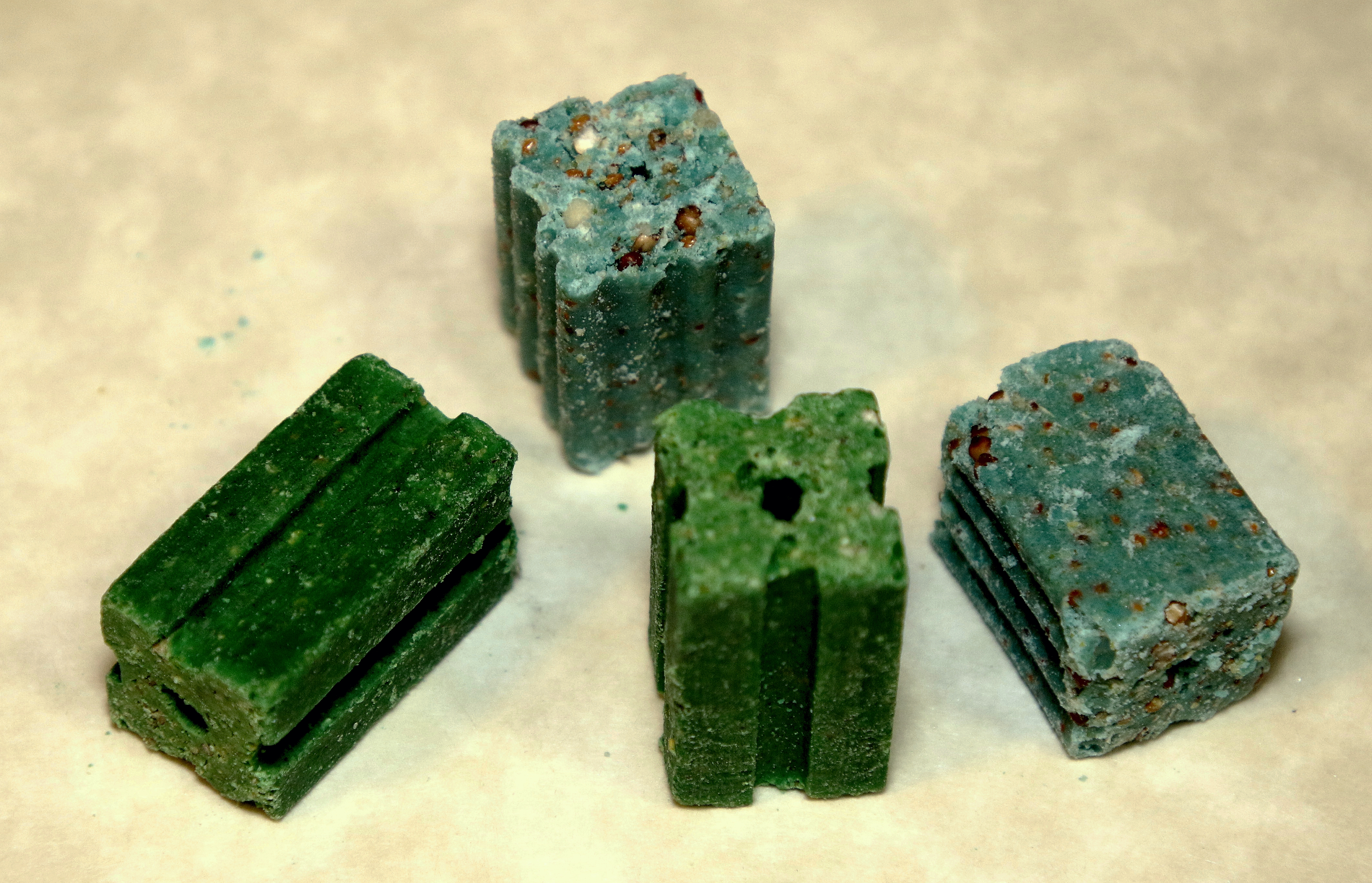
Poison baits infused with peanuts to attract rodents

=== Anticoagulants ===
Anticoagulants are defined as chronic (death occurs one to two weeks after ingestion of the lethal dose, rarely sooner), single-dose (second generation) or multiple-dose (first generation) rodenticides, acting by effective blocking of the vitamin-K cycle, resulting in inability to produce essential blood-clotting factors—mainly coagulation factors II (prothrombin) and VII (proconvertin).

In addition to this specific metabolic disruption, massive toxic doses of 4-hydroxycoumarin, 4-thiochromenone and 1,3-indandione anticoagulants cause damage to tiny blood vessels (capillaries), increasing their permeability, causing internal bleeding. These effects are gradual, developing over several days. In the final phase of the intoxication, the exhausted rodent collapses due to hemorrhagic shock or severe anemia and dies. The question of whether the use of these rodenticides can be considered humane has been raised.

The main benefit of anticoagulants over other poisons is that the time taken for the poison to induce death means that the rats do not associate the damage with their feeding habits.

- First-generation rodenticidal anticoagulants generally have shorter elimination half-lives, require higher concentrations (usually between 0.005% and 0.1%) and consecutive intake over days in order to accumulate the lethal dose, and are less toxic than second-generation agents.
- Second-generation anticoagulant rodenticides (or SGARs) are far more toxic than those of the first generation. They are generally applied in lower concentrations in baits—usually on the order of 0.001% to 0.005%—are lethal after a single ingestion of bait and are also effective against strains of rodents that became resistant to first-generation anticoagulants; thus, the second-generation anticoagulants are sometimes referred to as "superwarfarins".

Class	Examples
Coumarins/4-hydroxycoumarins	First generation: warfarin, coumatetralyl; Second generation: difenacoum, brodifacoum, flocoumafen and bromadiolone.
1,3-indandiones	diphacinone, chlorophacinone, pindone These are harder to group by generation. The U.S. Environmental Protection Agency considers chlorophacinone and diphacinone as first generation agents. According to some sources, the indandiones are considered second generation.
4-thiochromenones	Difethialone is the only member of this class of compounds. The EPA and California consider this to be an SGAR.
Indirect	Sometimes, anticoagulant rodenticides are potentiated by an antibiotic or bacteriostatic agent, most commonly sulfaquinoxaline. The aim of this association is that the antibiotic suppresses intestinal symbiotic microflora, which are a source of vitamin K. Diminished production of vitamin K by the intestinal microflora contributes to the action of anticoagulants. Added vitamin D also has a synergistic effect with anticoagulants.

Phylloquinone has been suggested, and successfully used, as antidote for pets or humans accidentally or intentionally exposed to anticoagulant poisons. Some of these poisons act by inhibiting liver functions and in advanced stages of poisoning, several blood-clotting factors are absent, and the volume of circulating blood is diminished, so that a blood transfusion (optionally with the clotting factors present) can save a person who has been poisoned, an advantage over some older poisons. A unique enzyme produced by the liver enables the body to recycle vitamin K. To produce the blood clotting factors that prevent excessive bleeding, the body needs vitamin K. Anticoagulants hinder this enzyme's ability to function. Internal bleeding could start if the body's reserve of anticoagulant runs out from exposure to enough of it. Because they bind more closely to the enzyme that produces blood clotting agents, single-dose anticoagulants are more hazardous. They may also obstruct several stages of the recycling of vitamin K. Single-dose or second-generation anticoagulants can be stored in the liver because they are not quickly eliminated from the body.

=== Metal phosphides ===
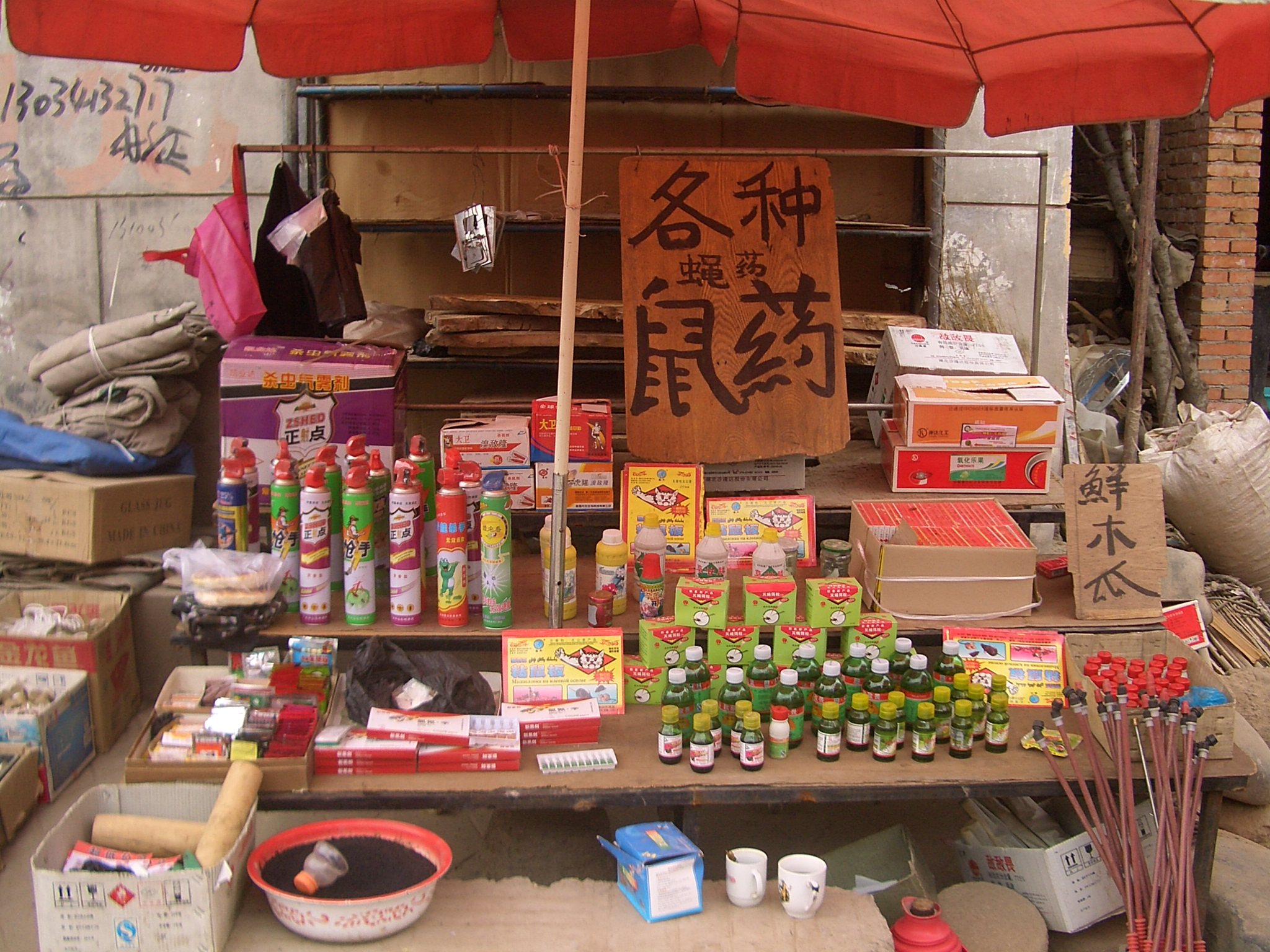
Rat poison vendor's stall at a market in Linxia City, China

Metal phosphides have been used as a means of killing rodents and are considered single-dose fast acting rodenticides (death occurs commonly within 1–3 days after single bait ingestion). A bait consisting of food and a phosphide (usually zinc phosphide) is left where the rodents can eat it. The acid in the digestive system of the rodent reacts with the phosphide to generate toxic phosphine gas. This method of vermin control has possible use in places where rodents are resistant to some of the anticoagulants, particularly for control of house and field mice; zinc phosphide baits are also cheaper than most second-generation anticoagulants, so that sometimes, in the case of large infestation by rodents, their population is initially reduced by copious amounts of zinc phosphide bait applied, and the rest of population that survived the initial fast-acting poison is then eradicated by prolonged feeding on anticoagulant bait. Inversely, the individual rodents that survived anticoagulant bait poisoning (rest population) can be eradicated by pre-baiting them with nontoxic bait for a week or two (this is important to overcome bait shyness, and to get rodents used to feeding in specific areas by specific food, especially in eradicating rats) and subsequently applying poisoned bait of the same sort as used for pre-baiting until all consumption of the bait ceases (usually within 2–4 days). These methods of alternating rodenticides with different modes of action gives actual or almost 100% eradications of the rodent population in the area, if the acceptance/palatability of baits are good (i.e., rodents feed on it readily).

Zinc phosphide is typically added to rodent baits in a concentration of 0.75% to 2.0%. The baits have strong, pungent garlic-like odor due to the phosphine liberated by hydrolysis. The odor attracts (or, at least, does not repel) rodents, but has a repulsive effect on other mammals. Birds, notably wild turkeys, are not sensitive to the smell, and might feed on the bait, and thus fall victim to the poison.

The tablets or pellets (usually aluminium, calcium or magnesium phosphide for fumigation/gassing) may also contain other chemicals which evolve ammonia, which helps reduce the potential for spontaneous combustion or explosion of the phosphine gas.

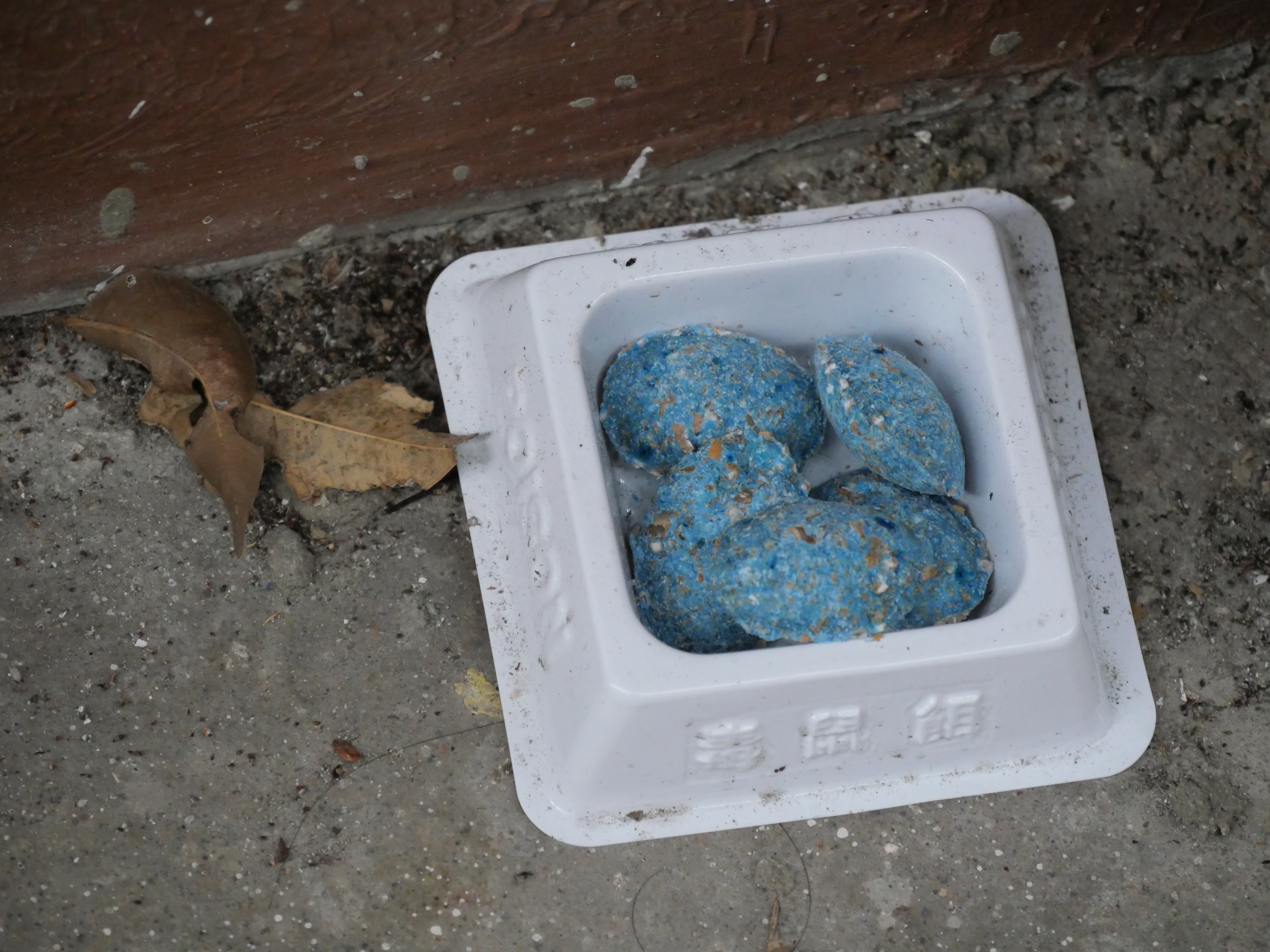
A rat poison at the shopping mall in Tuen Mun, Hong Kong

Metal phosphides do not accumulate in the tissues of poisoned animals, so the risk of secondary poisoning is low.

Before the advent of anticoagulants, phosphides were the favored kind of rat poison. During World War II, they came into use in the United States because of shortage of strychnine due to the Japanese occupation of the territories where the strychnine tree is grown. Phosphides are rather fast-acting rat poisons, resulting in the rats dying usually in open areas, instead of in the affected buildings.

Phosphides used as rodenticides include:

- aluminium phosphide (fumigant and bait)
- calcium phosphide (fumigant only)
- magnesium phosphide (fumigant only)
- zinc phosphide (bait only)

=== Hypercalcemia (vitamin D overdose) ===
Cholecalciferol (vitamin D_{3}) and ergocalciferol (vitamin D_{2}) are used as rodenticides. They are toxic to rodents for the same reason they are important to humans: they affect calcium and phosphate homeostasis in the body. Vitamins D are essential in minute quantities (few IUs per kilogram body weight daily, only a fraction of a milligram), and like most fat soluble vitamins, they are toxic in larger doses, causing hypervitaminosis D. If the poisoning is severe enough (that is, if the dose of the toxin is high enough), it leads to death. In rodents that consume the rodenticidal bait, it causes hypercalcemia, raising the calcium level, mainly by increasing calcium absorption from food, mobilising bone-matrix-fixed calcium into ionised form (mainly monohydrogencarbonate calcium cation, partially bound to plasma proteins, [CaHCO_{3}]^{+}), which circulates dissolved in the blood plasma. After ingestion of a lethal dose, the free calcium levels are raised sufficiently that blood vessels, kidneys, the stomach wall and lungs are mineralised/calcificated (formation of calcificates, crystals of calcium salts/complexes in the tissues, damaging them), leading further to heart problems (myocardial tissue is sensitive to variations of free calcium levels, affecting both myocardial contractibility and action potential propagation between the atria and ventricles), bleeding (due to capillary damage) and possibly kidney failure. It is considered to be single-dose, cumulative (depending on concentration used; the common 0.075% bait concentration is lethal to most rodents after a single intake of larger portions of the bait) or sub-chronic (death occurring usually within days to one week after ingestion of the bait). Applied concentrations are 0.075% cholecalciferol (30,000 IU/g) and 0.1% ergocalciferol (40,000 IU/g) when used alone, which can kill a rodent or a rat.

There is an important feature of calciferols toxicology, that they are synergistic with anticoagulant toxicant. In other words, mixtures of anticoagulants and calciferols in same bait are more toxic than a sum of toxicities of the anticoagulant and the calciferol in the bait, so that a massive hypercalcemic effect can be achieved by a substantially lower calciferol content in the bait, and vice versa, a more pronounced anticoagulant/hemorrhagic effects are observed if the calciferol is present. This synergism is mostly used in calciferol low concentration baits, because effective concentrations of calciferols are more expensive than effective concentrations of most anticoagulants.

The first application of a calciferol in rodenticidal bait was in the Sorex product Sorexa D (with a different formula than today's Sorexa D), back in the early 1970s, which contained 0.025% warfarin and 0.1% ergocalciferol. Today, Sorexa CD contains a 0.0025% difenacoum and 0.075% cholecalciferol combination. Numerous other brand products containing either 0.075-0.1% calciferols (e.g. Quintox) alone or alongside an anticoagulant are marketed.

The Merck Veterinary Manual states the following:

Although this rodenticide [cholecalciferol] was introduced with claims that it was less toxic to nontarget species than to rodents, clinical experience has shown that rodenticides containing cholecalciferol are a significant health threat to dogs and cats. Cholecalciferol produces hypercalcemia, which results in systemic calcification of soft tissue, leading to kidney failure, cardiac abnormalities, hypertension, CNS depression and GI upset. Signs generally develop within 18-36 hours of ingestion and can include depression, anorexia, polyuria and polydipsia. As serum calcium concentrations increase, clinical signs become more severe. ... GI smooth muscle excitability decreases and is manifest by anorexia, vomiting and constipation. ... Loss of renal concentrating ability is a direct result of hypercalcemia. As hypercalcemia persists, mineralization of the kidneys results in progressive renal insufficiency."

Additional anticoagulant renders the bait more toxic to pets as well as humans. Upon single ingestion, solely calciferol-based baits are considered generally safer to birds than second generation anticoagulants or acute toxicants. Treatment in pets is mostly supportive, with intravenous fluids and pamidronate disodium. The hormone calcitonin is no longer commonly used.

=== Other ===
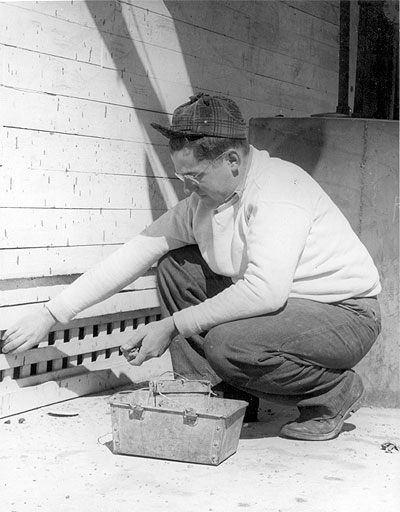
Civilian Public Service worker distributes poisoned bait for typhus control in Gulfport, Mississippi, c. 1945.

Other chemical poisons include:

- ANTU (α-naphthylthiourea; specific against Brown rat, Rattus norvegicus)
- Arsenic trioxide
- Barium carbonate (sometimes called Witherite)
- Chloralose (a narcotic prodrug)
- Crimidine (inhibits metabolism of vitamin B_{6})
- 1,3-Difluoro-2-propanol ("Gliftor")
- Endrin (organochlorine insecticide, used in the past for extermination of voles in fields)
- Fluoroacetamide ("1081")
- Phosacetim (a delayed-action acetylcholinesterase inhibitor)
- Phosphorus allotropes
- Pyrinuron (a urea derivative)
- Scilliroside and other cardiac glycosides like oleandrin or digoxin
- Sodium fluoroacetate ("1080")
- Strychnine (A naturally occurring convulsant and stimulant)
- Tetramethylenedisulfotetramine ("tetramine") - Deadly toxic to humans so use should be avoided
- Thallium sulfate
- Mitochondrial toxins like bromethalin and 2,4-dinitrophenol (cause high fever and brain swelling)
- Zyklon B/Uragan D2 (hydrogen cyanide gas absorbed in an inert carrier)

=== Combinations ===
In some countries, fixed three-component rodenticides, i.e., anticoagulant + antibiotic + vitamin D, are used. Associations of a second-generation anticoagulant with an antibiotic and/or vitamin D are considered to be effective even against most resistant strains of rodents, though some second generation anticoagulants (namely brodifacoum and difethialone), in bait concentrations of 0.0025% to 0.005% are so toxic that resistance is unknown, and even rodents resistant to other rodenticides are reliably exterminated by application of these most toxic anticoagulants.

== Low-toxicity/Eco-friendly rodenticides ==
Powdered corn cob and corn meal gluten have been developed as rodenticides. They were approved in the EU and patented in the US in 2013. These preparations rely on dehydration and electrolyte imbalance to cause death.

Inert gas killing of burrowing pest animals is another method with no impact on scavenging wildlife. One such method has been commercialized and sold under the brand name Rat Ice (a dry ice formulation).

== Non-target issues ==
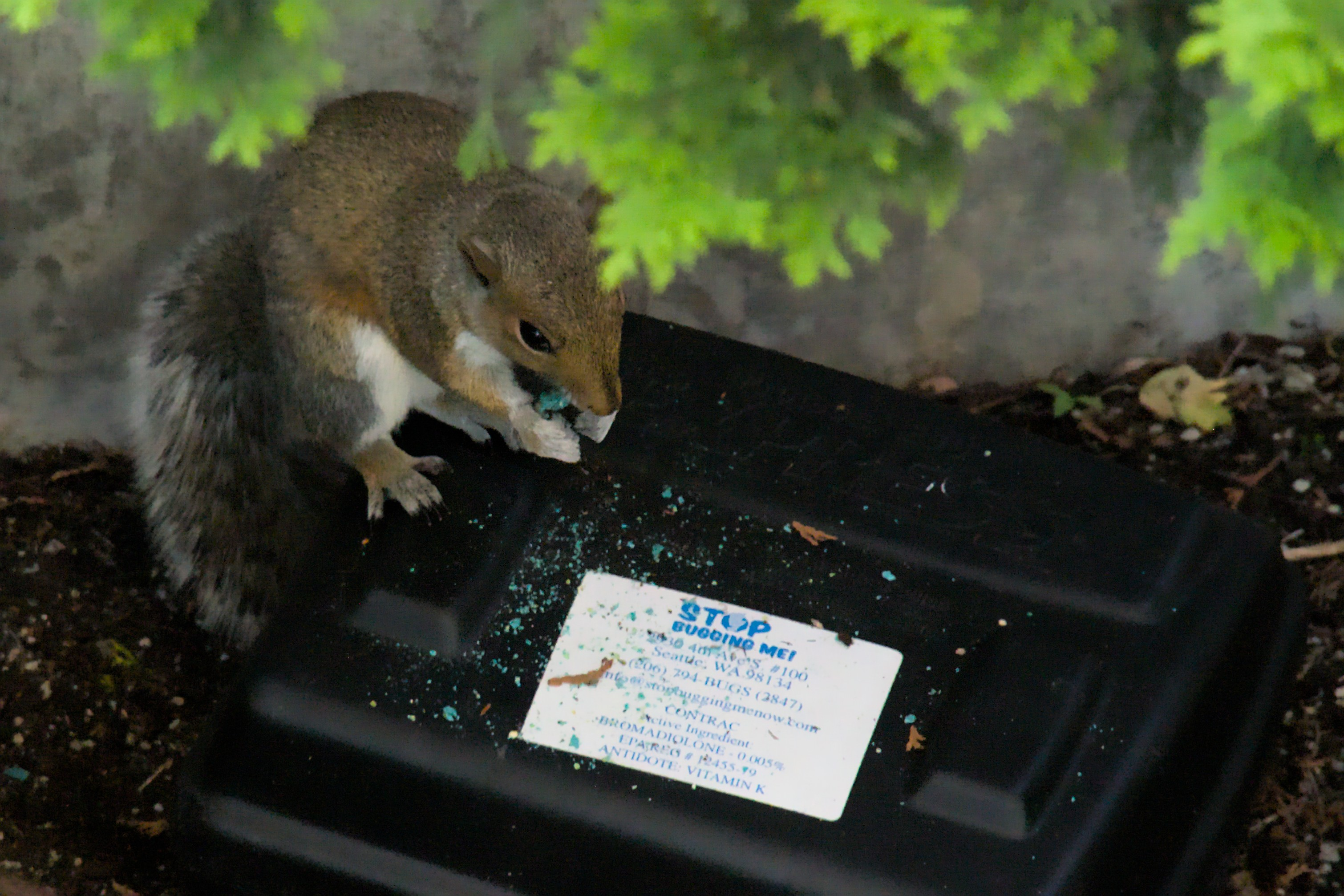
A tree squirrel eating rodenticide from a bait station intended for rats

=== Secondary poisoning and risks to wildlife ===
One of the potential problems when using rodenticides is that dead or weakened rodents may be eaten by other wildlife, either predators or scavengers. Members of the public deploying rodenticides may not be aware of this or may not follow the product's instructions closely enough. There is evidence of secondary poisoning being caused by exposure to prey.

The faster a rodenticide acts, the more critical this problem may be. For the fast-acting rodenticide bromethalin, for example, there is no diagnostic test or antidote.

This has led environmental researchers to conclude that low strength, long duration rodenticides (generally first generation anticoagulants) are the best balance between maximum effect and minimum risk.

=== Proposed US legislation change ===
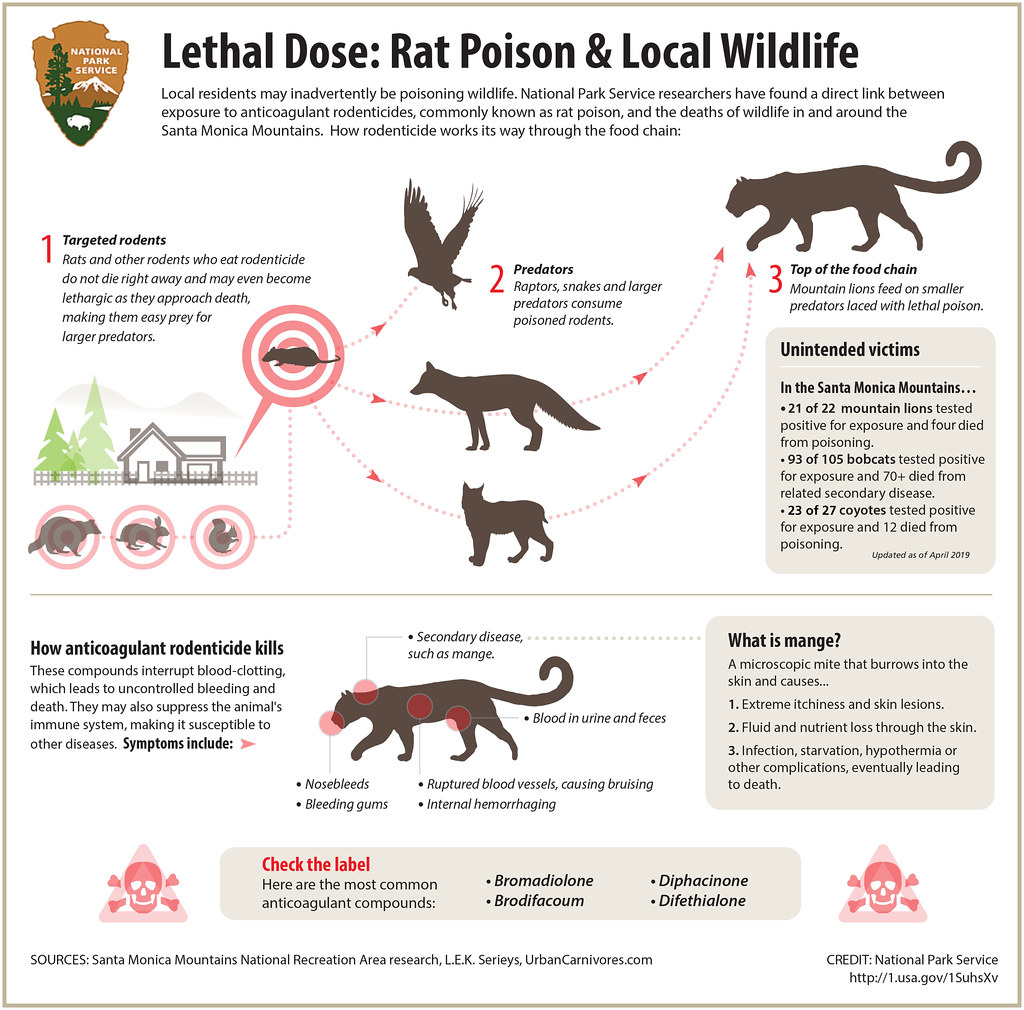
Secondary poisoning is caused by eating poisoned prey, showing how predators are effected not being the target within the environment.

In 2008, after assessing human health and ecological effects, as well as benefits, the US Environmental Protection Agency (EPA) announced measures to reduce risks associated with ten rodenticides. New restrictions by sale and distribution restrictions, minimum package size requirements, use site restriction, and tamper resistant products would have taken effect in 2011. The regulations were delayed pending a legal challenge by manufacturer Reckitt-Benkiser.

== Notable rat eradications ==
The entire rat populations of several islands have been eradicated, most notably New Zealand's Campbell Island, Alaska's Hawadax Island (formerly known as Rat Island), Macquarie Island and Canna, Scotland (declared rat-free in 2008). According to the Friends of South Georgia Island, all of the rats have been eliminated from South Georgia.

Alberta, Canada, through a combination of climate and control, is also believed to be rat-free.

== See also ==
- Poison shyness
- Pesticide
- Thallium poisoning
- Substances poisonous to dogs
