= Bromethalin =

Names
- Preferred IUPAC name N-Methyl-2,4-dinitro-N-(2,4,6-tribromophenyl)-6-(trifluoromethyl)aniline
- Other names 2,4,6-Tribromo-N-[2,4-dinitro-6-(trifluoromethyl)phenyl]-N-methylaniline

Identifiers
CAS Number	63333-35-7
3D model (JSmol)	Interactive image
ChemSpider	40463
ECHA InfoCard	100.109.042
KEGG	C18697
PubChem CID	44465
UNII	GM59MTH1FS
CompTox Dashboard (EPA)	DTXSID8032590
- InChI: InChI=1S/C14H7Br3F3N3O4/c1-21(13-9(16)2-6(15)3-10(13)17)12-8(14(18,19)20)4-7(22(24)25)5-11(12)23(26)27/h2-5H,1H3 Key: USMZPYXTVKAYST-UHFFFAOYSA-N; InChI=1/C14H7Br3F3N3O4/c1-21(13-9(16)2-6(15)3-10(13)17)12-8(14(18,19)20)4-7(22(24)25)5-11(12)23(26)27/h2-5H,1H3 Key: USMZPYXTVKAYST-UHFFFAOYAX
- SMILES: Brc2cc(Br)cc(Br)c2N(c1c([N+]([O-])=O)cc([N+]([O-])=O)cc1C(F)(F)F)C

Properties
Chemical formula	C_{14}H_{7}Br_{3}F_{3}N_{3}O_{4}
Molar mass	577.93 g/mol
- Except where otherwise noted, data are given for materials in their standard state (at 25 °C [77 °F], 100 kPa). verify (what is ?) Infobox references

Bromethalin is a neurotoxic rodenticide that damages the central nervous system.

== History ==
Bromethalin was discovered in the early 1980s through an approach to find replacement rodenticides for first-generation anticoagulants, especially to be useful against rodents that had become resistant to warfarin-type anticoagulant poisons. A structured study was undertaken to develop a substance that would be both poisonous to rodents, but also would be readily eaten by rodents. Bromethalin—N-methyl-2,4-dinitro-N (2,4,6-tribromophenyl)-6-(trifluoromethyl) benzeneamine— was the outcome of that study, as the specific formulation had both desired rodenticidal properties.

== Mechanism of action ==
Bromethalin works by being metabolised to n-desmethyl-bromethalin and uncoupling mitochondrial oxidative phosphorylation, which causes a decrease in adenosine triphosphate (ATP) synthesis. The decreased ATP inhibits the activity of the Na/K ATPase enzyme, thereby leading to a subsequent buildup of cerebral spinal fluid (CSF) and vacuolization of myelin. The excess CSF results in increased intracranial pressure, which in turn permanently damages neuronal axons. This damage to the central nervous system can cause paralysis, convulsions, and death.

== Risk of poisoning to humans and pets ==
Despite risk of severe symptoms and death, most unintentional pediatric exploratory exposures (licking or tasting a pellet) have not shown serious effects, and no deaths have been reported at this time in children, though toxicity is possible if significant amounts are ingested. Due to need for active metabolite generation to produce toxicity, fatal toxicity may be delayed by hours to days. All cases should be managed in consultation with a local poison control center. All intentional ingestions for self-harm carry significant risk of death or severe neurologic effects and require monitoring in a hospital setting.

In humans the most common initial effects of unintentional exposure are nausea, vomiting, abdominal pain, and diarrhea, though delayed seizures have been reported. No antidote for bromethalin is known; care is symptomatic and supportive.

In pets, signs to watch for include severe muscle tremors, hyperexcitability, fits, extreme sensitivity to being touched (hyperesthesia) and seizures that appear to be caused by light or noise. Owners of animals that have eaten bromethalin accidentally should seek immediate veterinary attention. Contacting an animal poison control center can help ensure that timely and appropriate therapy is started. The best treatment is decontamination, but this is effective only if started before symptoms appear.
