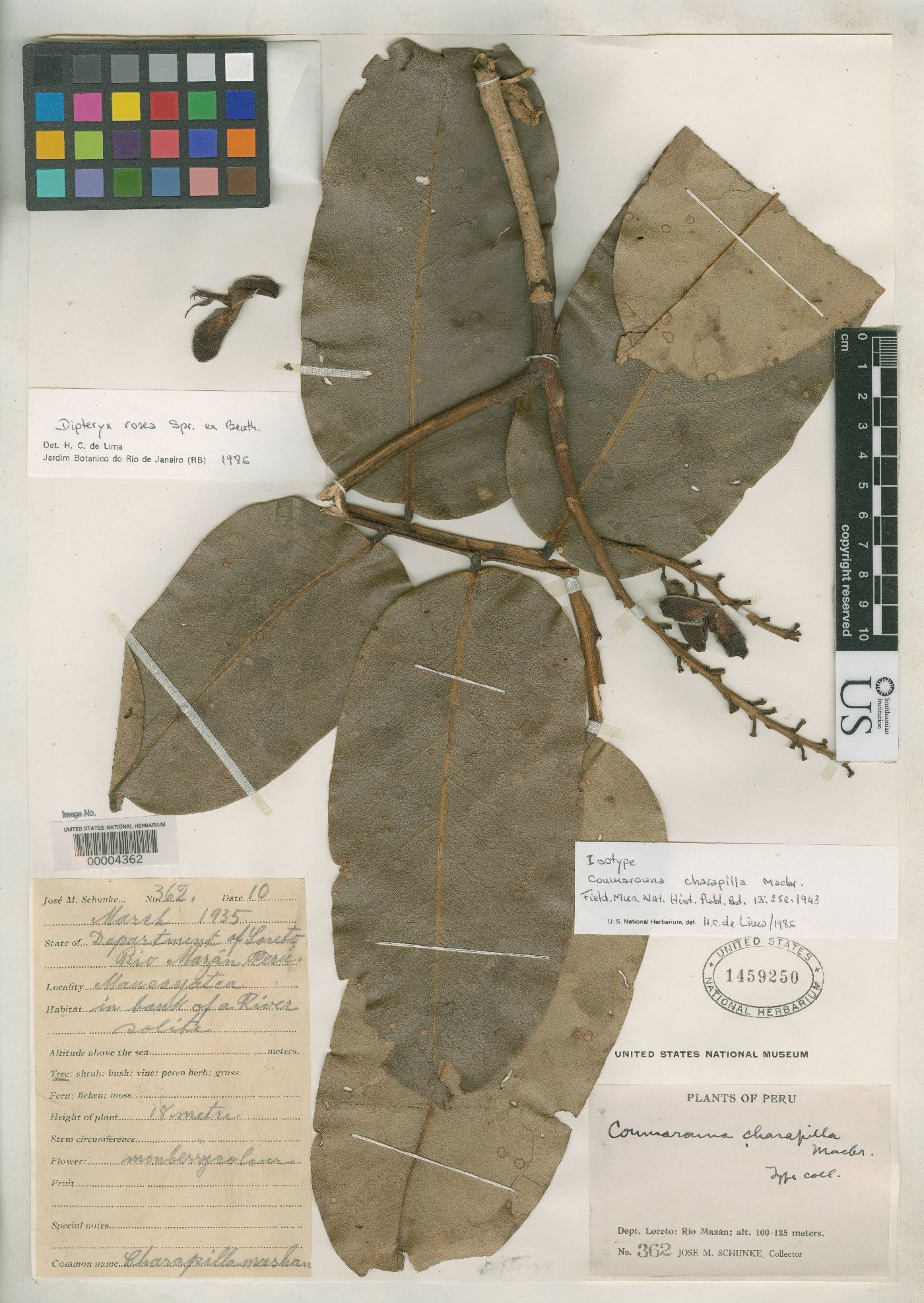

Conservation status
- Vulnerable (IUCN 2.3)

Scientific classification
- Kingdom: Plantae
- Clade: Tracheophytes
- Clade: Angiosperms
- Clade: Eudicots
- Clade: Rosids
- Order: Fabales
- Family: Fabaceae
- Subfamily: Faboideae
- Genus: Dipteryx
- Species: D. charapilla

Binomial name
- Dipteryx charapilla (J. F. Macbr.) Ducke, 1949

Synonyms
- Coumarouna charapilla J.F. Macbr., 1943

= Dipteryx charapilla =

Species of legume

Dipteryx charapilla is a little-known species of a flowering plant in the family Fabaceae, a large to mid-sized tree growing along rivers in the rainforests of Brazil and Peru.

== Description ==
=== Habitus ===
This plant is a relatively tall tree, 20-30m tall, with a trunk to 65 cm in diameter. The bark is covered in lenticels and coloured cream to grey in adults, but greenish in juvenile specimens, with cork scars distributed in depressed, isolated patches (as if the trunk was hammered). The ends of the twigs are also covered in lenticels.

=== Leaves ===
It has alternate compound leaves which are imparipinnate (with a lone terminal leaflet rather than a terminal pair of leaflets) and arranged spirally; the leaves having (2-) 3-4 pairs of leaflets distanced 3–6 cm apart from each other. The leaflets are shaped elliptic-ovalate and are alternate at the base of the leaf (alternipinnate). The leaflets have a rounded base, a cuspidate (pointy) apex, and have a length of 8.9-21.3 cm and a width of 4.9-8.5 cm.

=== Flowers ===
The inflorescence is a terminal panicle. The panicle is covered in a minutely puberulous layer. The 22-30mm long flower has a 4-6mm pedicel and a leathery calyx, 2-6mm in length and covered in an extremely fine puberulous layer. The calyx is split: the top half has two oblong "wings" which are 15mm in length and 6-7mm in width, with a rounded apex, formed from the upper two sepals, while the lower three sepals are small and fused together in a tiny lower lip. The petals form a corolla 14-19mm long consisting of the wings, keel and banner common to this sub-family of plants. The corolla colour has been described as "mulberry", "pinkish-purple" or "fuchsia", although the sepals of the calyx are coloured light yellow. Unique among the Dipteryx, in this species the calyx is said to be exceptionally hard, almost woody.

=== Fruit ===
The fruit (a bean pod) is an indehiscent drupe, elliptic or ovoid-oblong in shape and has juicy flesh within. The fruit may be green. The fruit pod contains a single, enlarged seed (bean). This species has pods and seeds with the typical scent of tonka.

=== Similar species ===
Other species of Dipteryx which are said to grow in the same area as this species are D. alata, D. ferrae, D. micrantha, D. odorata and D. rosea. D. charapilla is most similar to D. odorata and D. rosea. According to Macbride, it can be distinguished from D. odorata primarily due to the calyx being puberulous as opposed to densely tomentose. It can be distinguished from D. rosea in having smaller flowers. Furthermore, in D. rosea the calyx has three distinct teeth-like lobes on the lower part; in D. charapilla these lobes are obscure and indistinct.

== Taxonomy ==
This species was first described as Coumarouna charapilla in 1943 by James Francis Macbride citing as the holotype a sample, JS362, collected in 1935 by the important Peruvian plant collector José M. Lopez Schunke along the river bank of the Río Mazán in Maynas Province, Loreto, Peru. According to the Macbride, the collector Schunke relayed that this tree was known as charapilla by the locals. The word charapilla is a diminutive of the Quechua word charapa, meaning 'turtle', and refers to the shell-like half of an opened bean pod of this tree.

The second example was discovered in Esperança, Amazonas, Brazil, by Walter Adolpho Ducke in 1942, although it was only identified as such in 1985 by de Lima.

Ducke moved the species to the genus Dipteryx in 1949.

In 1975 a herbarium voucher identified as this species was collected along the banks of the Río Nanay in Maynas Province, Peru. It has since been collected in Maynas a number of times.

In the most recent monograph on the genus Dipteryx, A Checklist of the Dipterygeae species by the Brazilian researcher Haroldo Cavalcante de Lima in 1989, he synonymised D. charapilla with D. rosea. His taxonomy was accepted by ILDIS (2005) but not noticed or followed by some databases, i.e. the IUCN (1998) or the Catalogue of the Flowering Plants and Gymnosperms of Peru (1993), which was built using the Tropicos database by the Missouri Botanical Garden. By 2010 de Lima had changed his mind and had started to recognise D. charapilla as an independent species again and it was readmitted into the Lista de espécies Flora do Brasil.

Since 2014 local botanists from Brazil and Peru have collected many more additional specimens. The Herbario Herrerense (HH) at the Instituto de Investigaciones de la Amazonía Peruana in Iquitos, Peru, holds the most specimens at present.

== Distribution ==
Peru: In Maynas Province, Loreto, Peru, this species is known from three localised populations in the districts of Iquitos (along the Nanay River), San Juan Bautista (El Huayo Arboretum in Puerto Almendras) and Mazán (along the Río Mazán). Aldana et al. report that trees previously identified as D. odorata in Maynas Province, Peru are misidentified, and in actuality are D. charapilla.

Brazil: This species was collected from Amazonas in the early 1940s. Although not known in 2014, as of 2019 the distribution of this species has been expanded to the states of Acre and Rondônia in Brazil.

Bolivia: A collection from 1975 of a specimen identified as this species at the herbarium of the Museu Botânico Municipal in Bolivia is attributed to that country in error, as that particular collection is a duplicate of the 1975 collection (number 19865).

== Habitat ==
In Brazil this tree has been found in the Amazon rainforest growing on terra firme forest, várzea (inundated forest) and/or shaded tropical rainforest. In Peru it has been found growing in inundated forest along the banks of rivers, and along river banks in general (although this may be an artefact caused due to these being the easiest places to collect plant specimens).

It has been collected growing at altitudes of 90-125m.

== Conservation ==
In 1998 Oldfield et al. published a list of tropical tree species whose populations they believed to be threatened by extinction, which was adopted into the IUCN Red List. Likely working from the Tropicos database, they mistakenly believed that the taxon was endemic to the Amazon rainforest in the department of Loreto, Peru, and that it was "known only from the type locality". Hence, they decided to set the conservation status for the population of this species as 'vulnerable'. In Brazil, this species has not yet been evaluated by the Centro Nacional de Conservação da Flora. Trees are grown at the Centro de Investigaciones Jenaro Herrera and Puerto Almendras Arboretum in Peru. It is unclear if the population in Iquitos District is protected within the Allpahuayo-Mishana National Reserve.
