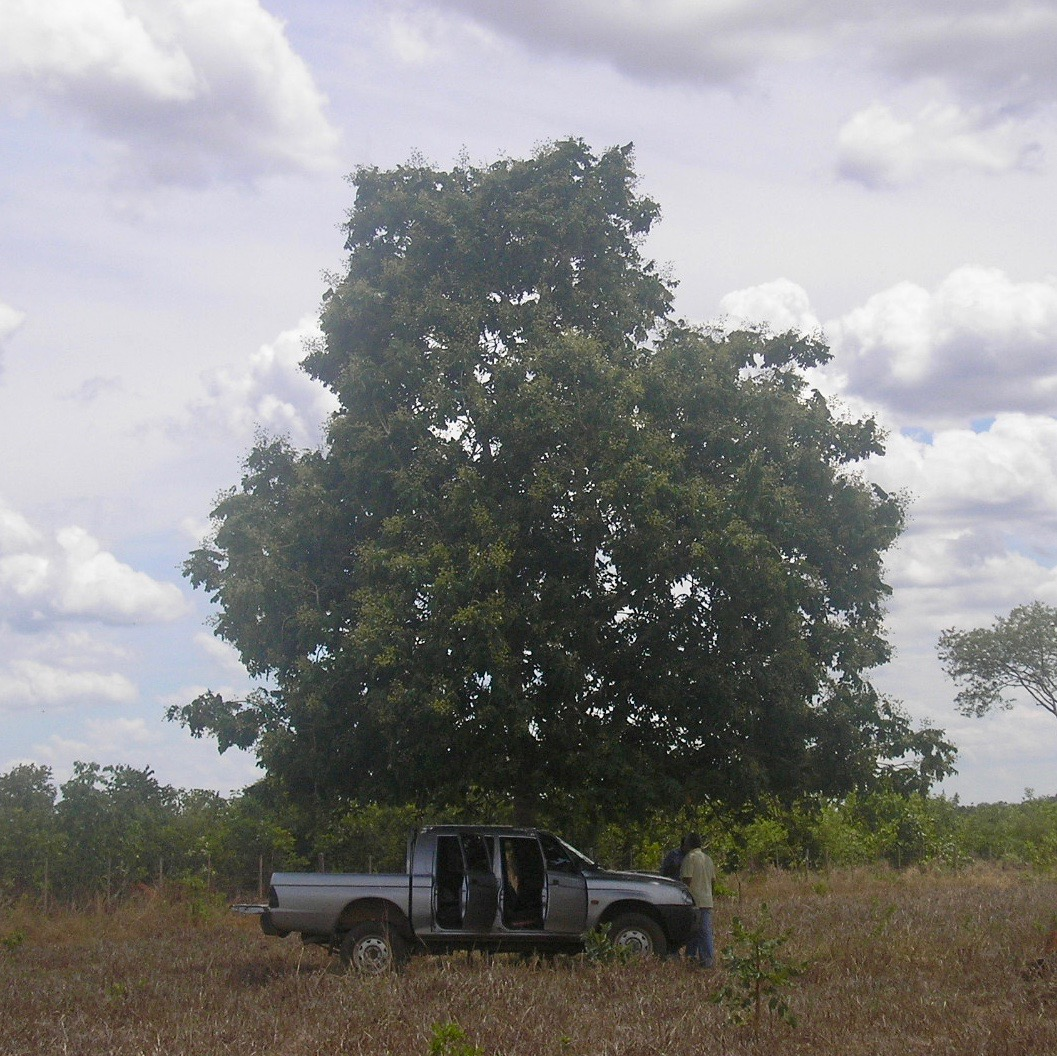

Conservation status
- Vulnerable (IUCN 3.1)

- Least Concern (CNCFlora)

Scientific classification
- Kingdom: Plantae
- Clade: Tracheophytes
- Clade: Angiosperms
- Clade: Eudicots
- Clade: Rosids
- Order: Fabales
- Family: Fabaceae
- Subfamily: Faboideae
- Genus: Dipteryx
- Species: D. alata

Binomial name
- Dipteryx alata Vogel

Synonyms
- Coumarouna alata (Vogel) Taub.; Dipteryx pteropus Mart.; Dipteryx pterota Benth.

= Dipteryx alata =

Species of legume

Dipteryx alata is a large, undomesticated, edible nut-bearing tree from dryish tropical lowlands in central South America belonging to the legume family, Fabaceae, from the Dipterygeae tribe in the Faboideae subfamily. It is a wild species, widespread across the Cerrado savanna in South America. The baru nut seed is a grain legume, growing in popularity in North America as a snack food.

== Vernacular names ==
It is known in Spanish as almendro (almond) in southern Bolivia's Santa Cruz Department, almendrillo in Pando in northern Bolivia, and shihuahuaco in the Department of Madre de Dios in southern Peru. In these last two regions, it shares the same name with Dipteryx micrantha. Both tree species are also known as mawi in the Ese Ejja language spoken there.

The common name baru appears to be the most used in Brazilian Portuguese. A long list of other names used in Brazil have been recorded; some of these names are barujo, coco-feijão, cumaruna, cumarurana, cumbaru, emburena-brava feijão-coco and imburana-brava. A number of names, such as cumaru and pau-cumaru, are shared with the closely related Amazonian D. odorata, the tonka bean or cumaru tree, due to the similarity of the two trees. Harri Lorenzi compiled most of these names in 1992, culled from the herbarium sheets he had collected, and the names can be traced to specific regions.

== Description ==
The tree can measure up to 25 metres (82 ft) in height and 0.7 m (2 1/2 ft) in diameter.

It has compound leaves with 6 to 14 leaflets. The greenish-white flowers are 6 to 15 millimetres (1/4 to 5/8 in) in diameter.

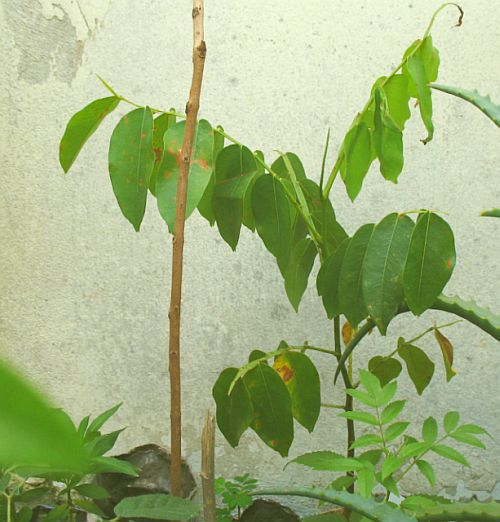
Young sapling cultivated in São Paulo.

The form of the fruit (a bean pod) is ovoid and contains juicy flesh within. The fruit has an average weight of 25 g and average dimensions of 52.40 ± 4.48 mm for length, and 38.31 ± 4.05 mm for width. Of these:

- 42% is pulp
- 53% is ligneous endocarp
- 5% is seed

== Taxonomy ==
The German botanist Julius Rudolph Theodor Vogel named the species alata, which means "winged" and refers to the winged petiole of the leaves. As a legume, this tree belongs to the botanical family Fabaceae; this is also known as Leguminosae, and commonly known as the bean, or pea, family. The Dipterygeae tribe is an early branching of the Faboideae subfamily of the legumes, dating ~58 million years and preceding staple legumes such as soybeans, peas or peanuts by ~10 million years. It is quite distant from other less-known legumes such as Inga, Parkia, Tylosema, or tamarinds).

== Distribution and habitat ==
It is native to Bolivia, Brazil, Paraguay and Peru.

Bolivia: It has been recorded in northwestern Bolivia in the province of Abel Iturralde (in northern La Paz Department) and Madre de Dios (in Pando Department), and in southeastern Bolivia in the provinces of Andrés Ibáñez, Chiquitos, Germán Busch, Ichilo, Ñuflo de Chávez, Sara and José Miguel de Velasco (all in Santa Cruz Department). It grows in the tropical savannah of the Chiquitania region. It grows in Noel Kempff Mercado National Park, and is thought to grow in Madidi National Park.

Brazil: It can be found in suitable habitat throughout central and western Brazil. It occurs in the north in the states of Pará and Tocantins, in the west in Acre, Amazonas and Rondônia, in the northeast in Bahia, Maranhão, Piauí and possibly Ceará, in the central-west in Distrito Federal, Goiás, Mato Grosso and Mato Grosso do Sul and in the southeast in Minas Gerais, Paraná and the Atlantic coast of São Paulo. According to Siqueira et al. (1992) it is almost extinct in the wild in these last two states, but found almost exclusively planted ex situ.

Paraguay: It has been recorded from central eastern Paraguay in the departments of Amambay and Concepción.

Peru: It has been recorded in Peru in the departments of Huánuco (Pachitea Province), Loreto (Maynas and Ucayali provinces) and Madre de Dios (Tambopata Province).

== Ecology ==
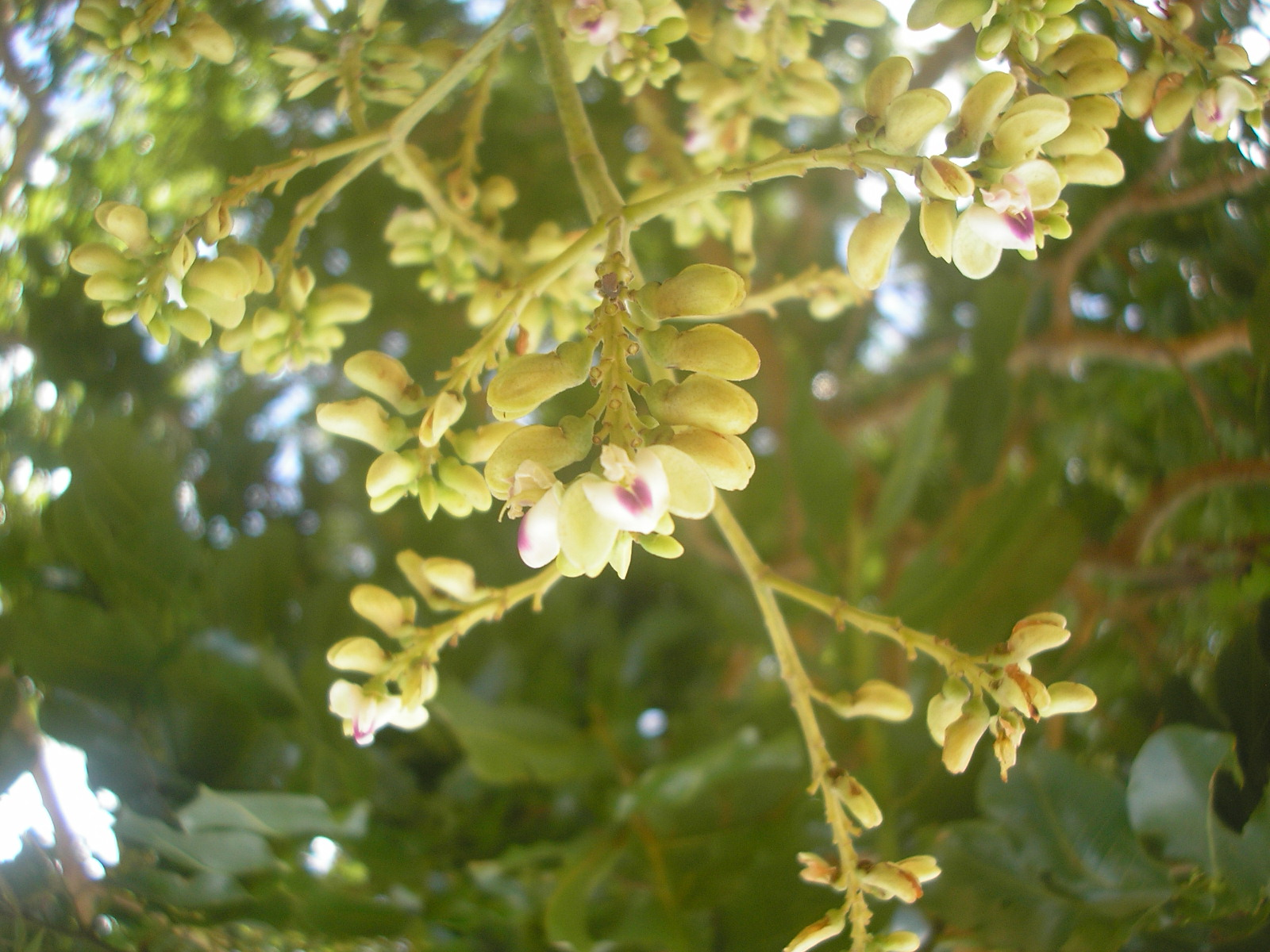
Flowers in December in Brazil

=== Habitat ===
Of all the species of Dipteryx this species has the most southerly distribution and is the only one which grows in regions with marked seasons.

It is found in the Amazon, Caatinga and central Brazilian savannah (called Cerrado in Brazil) phytogeographical regions. It grows mostly in the vegetative associations of Cerrado, but also in tropical riverine and/or gallery forests, seasonally semi-deciduous tropical forests and Amazonian savannahs.

It grows in areas with soil of low fertility in northern Bolivia, but in Goiás it is typical for Cerrado areas with more soil fertility, where it occurs uniformly. It may reliably be used as an indicator species of such conditions (Macedo, 1992), not occurring where the fertility is naturally very low.

=== Interspecific relationships ===
Unlike most legumes, baru trees harbor no symbiotic nitrogen-fixing bacteria in root nodules and depend on fixing nitrogen from water tables with their deep roots.

A tree will produce about 150 kg of fruit per harvest in alternating years, being pollinated by native bees. The fruits are food for birds and small mammals, such as rodents, bats, and monkeys.

== Conservation ==
According to D.K. Requena Suarez, an assessor writing for the IUCN in 2021, this species is vulnerable primarily due to its usage as timber and habitat loss by conversion of the Brazilian cerrado to intensive farming. It is listed under CITES Appendix II as one of the Dipteryx species with protections against trade in certain types of its timber products scheduled to be effective 25 November 2024.

== Uses ==
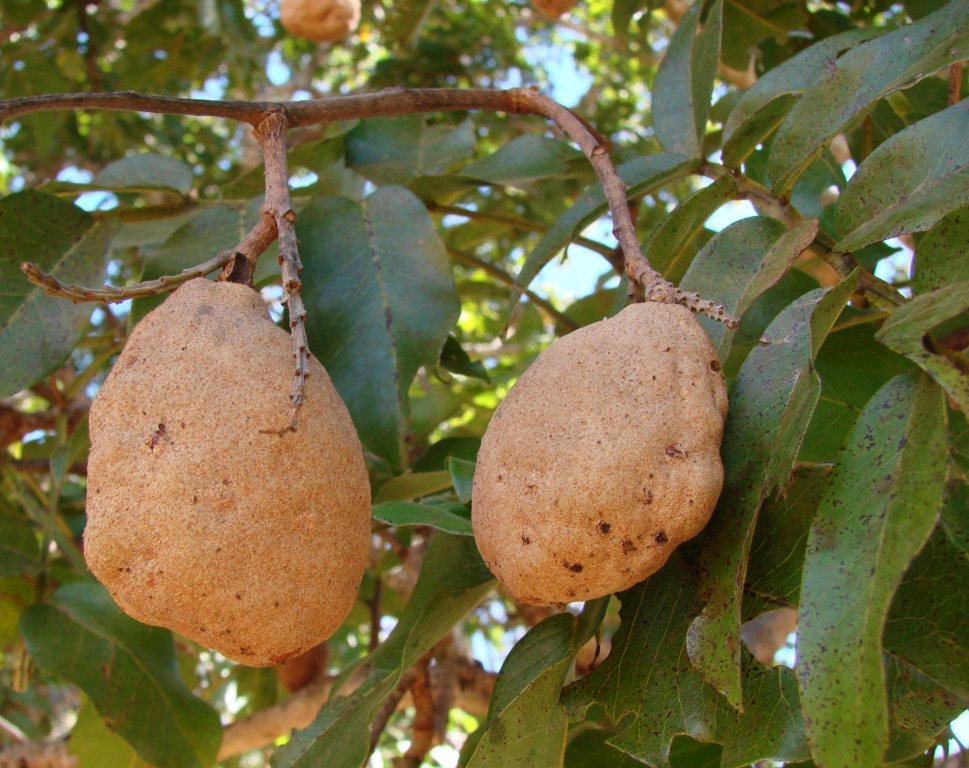
Fruits of Dipteryx alata hanging from a branch in Formosa, Goiás in July

It is used as lumber, for charcoal production, and shade in pastures, by the indigenous peoples of its range. The fruits are often used as cattle feed. The seeds are a nutritious part of the local communities' diet.. Since 2024, Baru nut has gained recognition in the nuts industry as a daily snack.

According to Alexiades some among the Ese Ejja people, which have recently started using the hallucinogenic drug ayahuasca, see visions of concrete houses under the influence of this drug, which according to a source interviewed by Alexiades represents a tree of this species. Alexiades theorizes that this tree is to be considered a "teacher plant" in the new ayahuasca shamanism that the Ese Ejja have adopted and that it, in specific, and trees in general, represents the "future".

Uses for the fruit can be summarized as:

| Part of the fruit | Product/sub-product | Uses |
|---|---|---|
| Pulp | Pulp in natura | Human food |
| Pulp | Pulp in natura | Animal food |
| Pulp | Pulp in natura | Medicinal/Pharmaceutical |
| Pulp | Dehydrated Pulp | Human food |
| Pulp | Dehydrated Pulp | Animal food |
| Pulp | Dehydrated Pulp | Medicinal/Pharmaceutical |
| Pulp | Flour | Human food |
| Pulp | Alcohol/Liqueur | Human consumption |
| Pulp | Alcohol/Liqueur | Medicinal/Pharmaceutical |
| Pulp | Alcohol/Liqueur | Cosmetics |
| Pulp | Alcohol/Liqueur | Industrial |
| Pulp | Residues | Farming (organic fertilizer) |
| Seed | Raw Seed | Human food |
| Seed | Raw Seed | Animal food |
| Seed | Raw Seed | Medicinal/Pharmaceutical |
| Seed | Raw Seed | Agricultural (seeding) |
| Seed | Roasted Seed | Human Food |
| Seed | Flour | Human Food |
| Seed | Milk | Human Food |
| Seed | Oil | Human food |
| Seed | Oil | Medicinal/Pharmaceutical |
| Seed | Oil | Cosmetics |
| Seed | Oil | Industrial |
| Seed | Cake | Human food |
| Seed | Cake | Medicinal/Pharmaceutical |
| Seed | Cake | Cosmetics |
| Seed | Cake | Industrial |
| Seed | Paste/Butter | Human food |
| Ligneous endocarp | Charcoal | Fuel |
| Ligneous endocarp | Pyroligneous acid and tar | Industrial |
| Ligneous endocarp | Ligneous Endocarp | Artisanry |

=== Cultivation ===
A tree has a useful lifespan of 60 years.

The baru tree grows wild, but there are recent attempts at large-scale cultivation. The fruit matures shortly before the rainy season in the cerrado, which could range between June and October depending on its latitude.

Its brown fruits are either collected from the ground or picked from the tree when they are almost ripe.

Baru fruit extraction is a profitable alternative to deforestation. Several cerrado communities rely on the sale of baru fruits and seeds as a source of revenue.

=== Food and nutrition ===
Out of the fruit, the pulp is sweet and nutritious. It can be consumed fresh but is also used to manufacture jams, jellies, and liquors. Baru seeds are high in fat, proteins, dietary fibers, magnesium, iron and zinc.

=== Baru seed ===
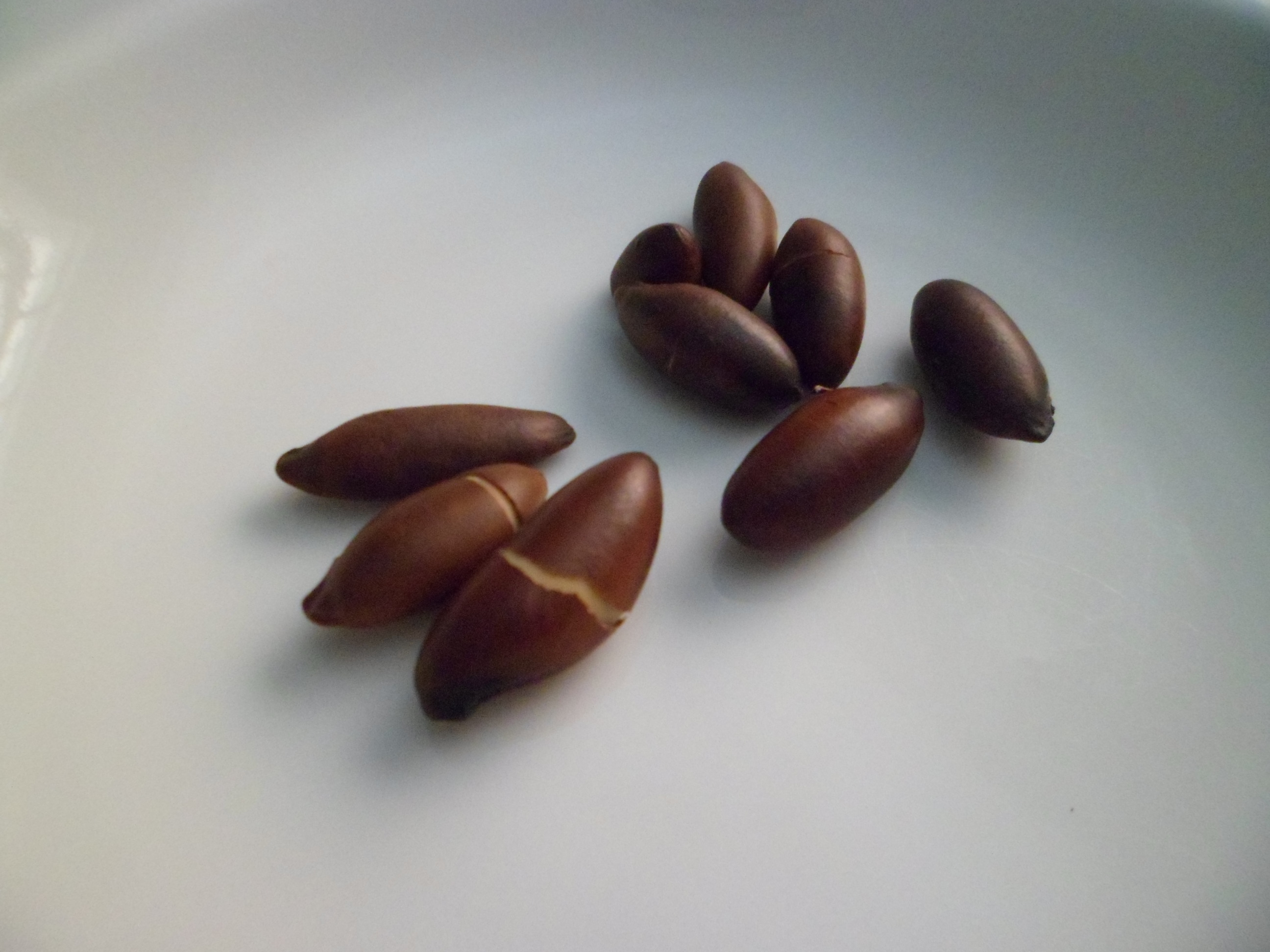
Baru seeds

Baru seed, dry-roasted
Nutritional value per 100 g (3.5 oz)
- Energy: 2,238 kJ (535 kcal)
- Carbohydrates: 13.6 g
- Sugars: 0.0 g
- Dietary fiber: 9.2 g
- Fat: 42 g
- Saturated: 7.6 g
- Monounsaturated: 21.4 g
- Polyunsaturated: 13.8 g
- Protein: 29 g
Vitamins and minerals
| Vitamins | Quantity %DV^{†} |
| Vitamin E | 143% 21.4 mg |
| Minerals | Quantity %DV^{†} |
| Calcium | 8% 110 mg |
| Iron | 27% 4.8 mg |
| Magnesium | 39% 164 mg |
| Phosphorus | 67% 832 mg |
| Potassium | 33% 980 mg |
| Zinc | 42% 4.6 mg |
- ^{†}Percentages estimated using US recommendations for adults, except for potassium, which is estimated based on expert recommendation from the National Academies.

The baru seed, also known as the baru nut, baru almond, or chiquitanian almond, is the seed of Dipteryx alata. It is classified as a tertiary grain legume, as its supply chain is still limited. Atypically among legume crop plants, baru seeds develop from a tree and are dispersed by animals, particularly birds, bats, and rodents.

Baru seeds are mild in flavor with a taste similar to peanuts, almonds, cashews, and pistachios and are often served in similar ways in Western cuisines, roasted and salted, though it's also consumed raw. The botanical definition of a "nut" is a fruit whose ovary wall becomes hard at maturity. Using this criterion, the baru seed is not a nut given its unique fruit. However, it was initially translated in English as "nut" due to the first internationally published articles translating the word "castanha" from Portuguese.

Baru seeds are highly nutritious and rich in: antioxidants (mainly tocopherol)s, protein, dietary fiber, omega-6 fatty acids, omega-3 fatty acids, magnesium, potassium, phosphorus, and zinc.

Baru seeds should be served after heating through boiling, baking, or roasting, which deactivates a trypsin inhibitor enzyme. The trypsin inhibitor, if not deactivated, will not allow the high protein content in baru seeds to be digested.

Baru seeds are used mostly as an occasional salted snack by local communities since manually extracting them is difficult. In Canada and the United States, baru seeds are used as a snack and ingredient and are slowly being adopted as a peanut substitute. Individually, they are eaten dry-roasted. Baru nuts are growing in popularity as an individual snack, and as an ingredient in other food such as protein bars.

==== Allergies ====
Baru seeds come from one of the earliest branches of legumes (called Dipterygeae) and did not evolve some characteristics of more derived, commonly consumed legumes. This applies to proteins similar to allergenic ones present in peanuts, soybeans or peas, for example, bearing no risk of cross-reactivity. They are also unrelated to tree nuts.

However, due to their early-stage processing chain, there is a possibility of cross-contamination with native nuts from Brazil such as cashews and Brazil nuts if processed in a shared facility.
