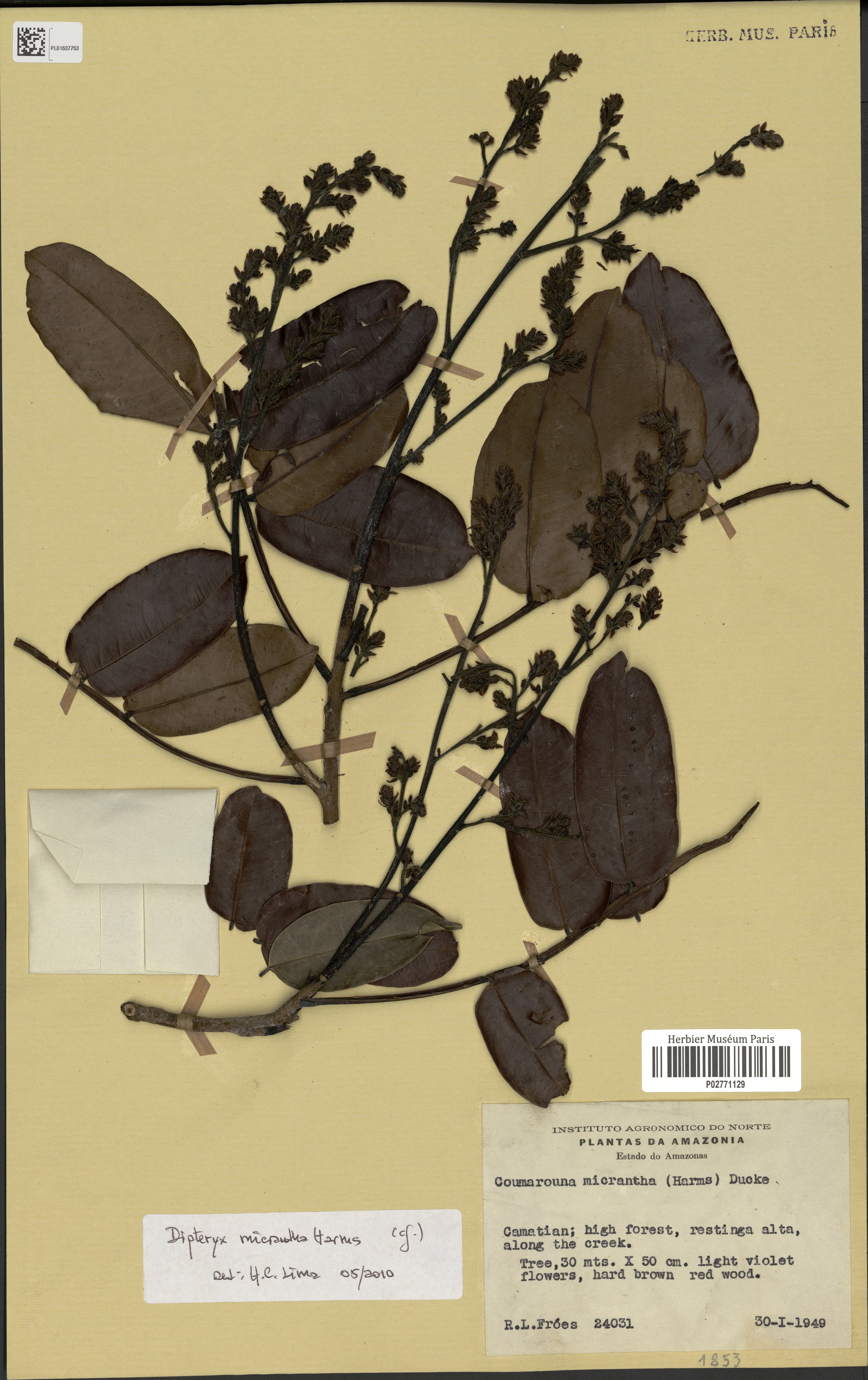
- Dipteryx micrantha - exsiccatum at MNHN herbier (P); ex. Camatian, Amazonas, Brazil; coll. R.L. Froes 1949; det. H.C. de Lima

Scientific classification
- Kingdom: Plantae
- Clade: Embryophytes
- Clade: Tracheophytes
- Clade: Spermatophytes
- Clade: Angiosperms
- Clade: Eudicots
- Clade: Rosids
- Order: Fabales
- Family: Fabaceae
- Subfamily: Faboideae
- Genus: Dipteryx
- Species: D. micrantha

Binomial name
- Dipteryx micrantha Harms, 1926

Synonyms
- Coumarouna micrantha (Harms) Ducke, 1940

= Dipteryx micrantha =

Species of legume

Dipteryx micrantha is a tropical flowering plant, a giant tree in the Faboideae subfamily of the bean family Fabaceae. It is a dominant emergent tree in parts of the rainforests of Bolivia, Brazil, Colombia, Ecuador and Peru. In the international timber market, this species is traded under the name cumaru. It furnishes a dense, hard, beautiful reddish timber which has become a popular import in the 2010s for use in parquet. The ornamental bunches of lilac pink flowers high in the canopy eventually develop into a mass of large fruit pods, which are an important food for many native animals during the dry season. The fruit contains a single oily seed which is edible, although these seeds are not exploited as a commercial product.

== Vernacular names ==
In northeastern Peru, a local common name which has been recorded for this plant since its discovery by Western scientists is charapilla. This name is shared with Dipteryx charapilla. The word charapilla is a diminutive of the Quechua word charapa, meaning 'turtle', and refers to the shell-like half of an opened bean pod of this tree. It is also known as coumarou or almendrillo in Bolivia, and shihuahuaco in the Department of Madre de Dios in southern Peru. In both these last two regions it shares the same name with D. alata. The word almendrillo is a diminutive of the Spanish almendro, meaning almond. Both tree species are also known as mawi in the Ese Eja language spoken there. Other names used for this plant that are or have been used in Peru are huamansamana (in Loreto), shihuahuaco negro (in Huánuco), cumarú and guacamayo.

The name kumarut as given in many sources starting in 1926 is only attested to the first collection of this plant by Günther Tessmann from along the Marañón river. Adolpho Ducke in 1940 states his belief it is a misspelling of cumarú. Tessmann, in his notes, in fact spells the name kumarú.

== Taxonomy ==
The specific epithet micrantha is compounded from the Greek μικρός (mikrós), meaning "small" and ἄνθος (anthos) meaning “flower”.

The holotype was first collected by Günther Tessmann in early 1925 at the mouth of the Pastaza River along the northern shore of the Marañón river, below stream from the Pongo de Manseriche, in Datem del Marañón Province, Department of Loreto. This specimen found its way down the Amazon River to Germany, where a bit less than two years later Hermann Harms described it as a new species, choosing the name Dipteryx micrantha (he initially vacillated with the name D. parviflora which means the same in Latin as the present does in Greek). The holotype was housed in the Berlin herbarium (B).^{a}

The second time this species was collected was 5 years later by Guillermo Klug in 1930 at a place near Iquitos, once called Mishuyacu, in Maynas Province, Department of Loreto.

In 1940, Adolpho Ducke re-described it under the name Coumarouna. A botanical taxonomic congress had decided many years before that the older name Dipteryx should be conserved, to which Ducke found himself unable to comply with at the time objecting primarily because of morphological grounds. Ducke changed his mind in 1949.

In the most recent monograph on the genus Dipteryx, A Checklist of the Dipterygeae species by the Brazilian researcher Haroldo Cavalcante de Lima in 1989, D. ferrae was synonymised with D. micrantha. His taxonomy was accepted by ILDIS (2005) but not noticed or followed by some works such as the Catalogue of the Flowering Plants and Gymnosperms of Peru (1993) or the Tropicos database by the Missouri Botanical Garden. By 2010, de Lima had changed his mind and had started to recognise D. ferrae as an independent species again.

As of the late 2010s this species is mostly (mis-)identified as Coumarouna odorata in agroforestry in Peru, and is recorded as such by MINAG, the Peruvian institute of forestry, which collects statistics of this species under both names.

== Description ==
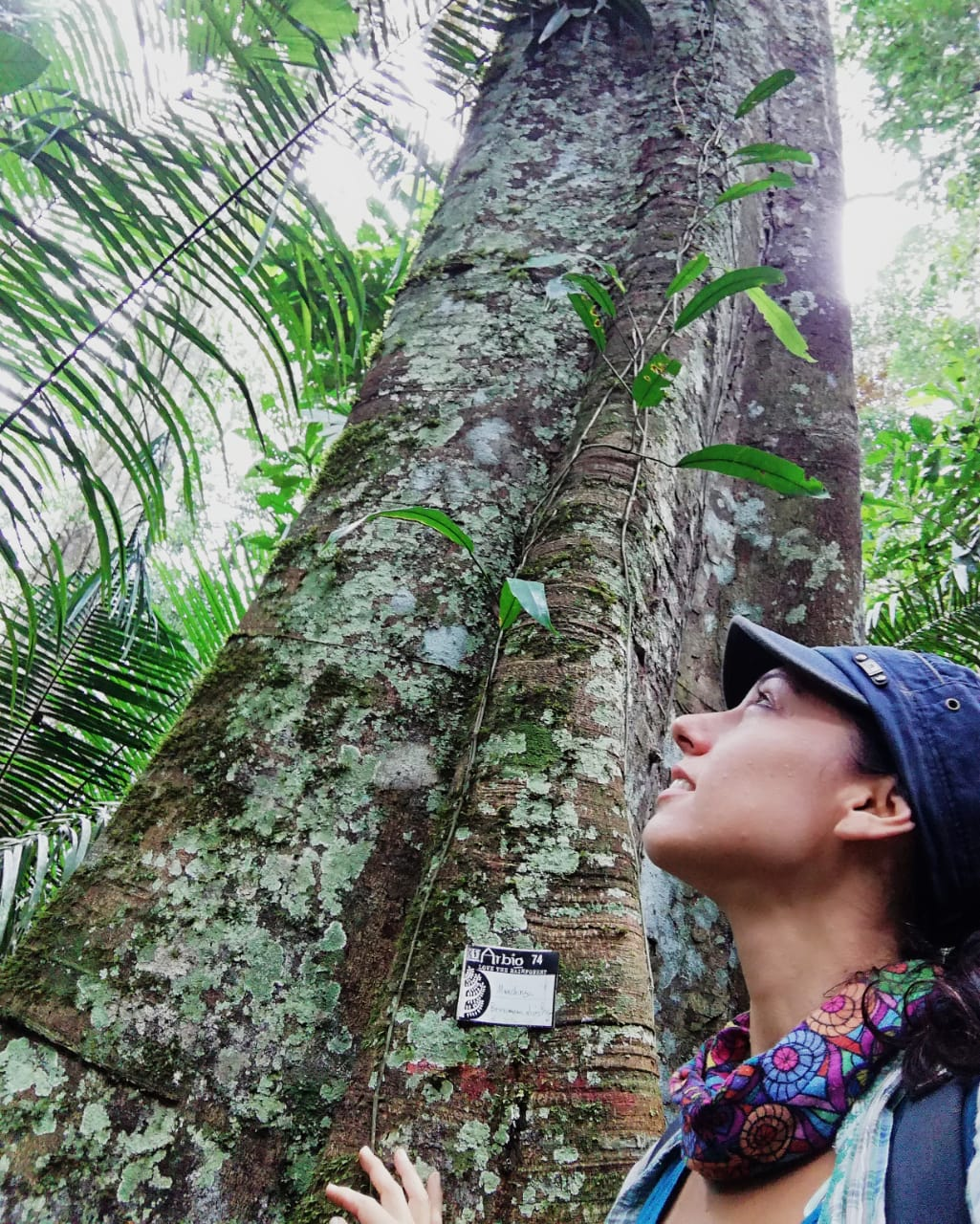
Dipteryx micrantha in the Peruvian Amazonia

Habitus: This is a very large tree, sometimes growing up to 60m, although in Manú National Park in Peru the average height was 44m. The trunk has large buttresses although individual trees have been recorded with smallish buttresses. The buttresses can grow to 4m high and 1.5m thick in mature individuals. In young trees, the buttresses may faintly snake up the trunk, giving a furrowed or corrugated profile to a cross-section of the trunk, but in older mature trees the bole is cylindrical. The base is wide and parasol-shaped. The bark is distinctively coloured salmon.

The trunk can grow to 2 m in diameter.

Leaves: It has compound leaves, with the number of the leaflets 6 to 14. 9-11 leaflets groove running down the upper side of the leaf rachis.

Flowers: leathery calyx coloured pinkish; size of the calyx 20 to 25. calyx membranous, upper calyx "wings" appear petalous. lilac light violet

Fruit: The fruit is ovoid or oblong in shape, with a fleshy pericarp. The seed is large. Unlike other some species of Dipteryx, the pods and seeds of this tree do not have the typical scent of coumarin. The seeds are oily and edible.^{b}

=== Infraspecific variation ===
At least in Peru, D. micrantha exists in two discreet, easily distinguished morphotypes, which are furthermore chorologically distinct. These morphotypes have not been named taxonomically.

Morphotype 1:

Morphotype 2:

=== Similar species ===
Other species of Dipteryx which are said to grow in the same area (Peru) as this species are D. alata, D. charapilla, D. ferrae, D. odorata and D. rosea. It shares a number of features with D. ferrae (see taxonomy), according to James Francis Macbride differing primarily in the higher number of leaflets which comprise its compound leaves.

== Distribution ==
Bolivia: It is known in Bolivia from the departments of Beni, Cochabamba, La Paz, Pando and Santa Cruz.

Brazil: It is found in the Brazilian states of Acre, Amazonas and Rondônia.

Colombia: It is found in Colombia in the departments of Amazonas, Caquetá and Meta in the ecoregions of the Amazon rainforest, the Colombian Guayana region, the Orinoco rainforests and the foothills of the Serranía de la Macarena.

Ecuador: It is known to grow in Aguarico Canton in Orellana Province near the Peruvian border.

Peru: It has been found growing in the departments of Huánuco, Loreto, Madre de Dios, Puno and Ucayali.

== Ecology ==
These enormous trees are emergent above the canopy. It is a relatively common species in parts of the rainforest, occurring at densities of 0-6 trees per hectare.

Flowering takes place high in the crown of the tree shortly after the start of the rainy season. The fruit are ripe in the height of the dry season; only a few other tree species fruit in these forests at this time, making them an important food source for local wildlife.

The seedlings are shade-tolerant, but survive to maturity only in or near gaps in the canopy, such as those formed by fallen trees.

=== Habitat ===
It occurs in mature, seasonal, evergreen tropical rainforest, which has dry and wet seasons, on alluvial soils in floodplains, but it does not typically grow in forests inundated under water for a large part of the year (várzea), although it has been collected in flood-free areas in this type of habitat, as well as water-logged terrain on terra firme. Besides primary woodland it also grows in secondary woodland (after logging operations) and disturbed habitats such as pastures, smallholder farms (chacras) and plantations. It has also been collected in dry woods in the Department of Huánuco in Peru. It has been recorded in brown clay and alluvial soils. In Colombia it grows to an altitude of 100m. In Ecuador it has been collected at 200 to 250m altitude. Specimens have been collected from 135 to 400m in Peru, and 180 to 850m in Bolivia.

=== Interspecific relationships ===
It occurs together with the palms Astrocaryum murumuru, Iriartea deltoidea and Attalea cephalotes in southern Peru.

In Orellana Province in eastern Ecuador, it is found growing together with the there-common trees Cedrelinga catenaeformis, Croton tessmannii and Brownea macrophylla.

This species primarily uses two different groups of animals sequentially to disperse its seeds. Initially fruit-eating bats (Artibeus spp.) carry off ripe fruit to their feeding roosts low in the understory (3-5m), where they drop the large seeds to the forest floor, these seeds lie singly or in small piles. Secondarily the seeds are eaten by large to medium-sized rodents, mostly spiny rats in the Proechimys genus and the agouti Dasyprocta variegata, which may carry off seeds to hide in caches. Many seeds escape being eaten by the rodents, which in Manú National Park in Peru commonly miss a third of the seeds, often due to satiation.

In Peru, other animals seen eating the ripe fruit pulp in the crown of this tree are the spider monkeys Ateles paniscus and Didelphis spp. opossums, both of which simply drop the seeds to the ground under the parent tree while they eat. In Brazil, animals seen eating the fruit were bats, macaws and monkeys.

== Uses ==
=== Food ===
The seeds are oily and edible. These are a prized food in traditional Ese Eja cuisine in southern Peru.

=== Charcoal and firewood ===
It makes good firewood. The wood is also heated slowly to make charcoal. Charcoal is the most important fuel used in restaurant and domestic ovens for cooking, and is also important for barbecues and heating. It is especially important for the poor. In Peru in 2008, according to the Dirección General Forestal y de Fauna Silvestre (DGFF), 96% of all charcoal in the country is produced from dry woodlands in three neighbouring northern departments, of which almost everything was produced in the small department of Lambayeque from Prosopis pallida. Because this is unsustainable, researchers have recommended exploiting the abundant stock of the Peruvian Amazon to produce needed charcoal, especially from secondary woodlands. The Amazon rainforest has great potential as a charcoal source, but is undeveloped and under-utilized. The department of Loreto, the largest department of Peru with abundant forest reserves, is unconnected to markets in the rest of the country and only limited amounts of charcoal are produced, exclusively for local consumption. DGFF statistics confirm that D. micrantha, Manilkara bidentata and Calycophyllum spruceanum are the most abundant and suitable species used for production of charcoal of high caloric value in the Amazon, possibly also as a by-product of the parquet industry. In the city of Iquitos D. micrantha and Cedrelinga cateniformis are among the most important species used for charcoal production. D. micrantha charcoal produced at 400 °C is considered "B" quality and has a density of 543 kg/m3, a fixed carbon content of 68.77% and a caloric value of 8466.82 kcal/kg. Produced at 300 °C it is considered "C" quality and has a density of 680 kg/m3, a fixed carbon content of 33.69% and a caloric value of 5600.28 kcal/kg.

=== Timber ===
The wood is hard, beautiful and of high quality, but until recently was only rarely exploited locally. In the 1930s boats were made from the wood near Iquitos in Peru. In 1999 the main uses were as railway sleepers, vehicle frameworks, bridges over narrow ravines, flooring, heavy construction, external (outdoor) woodwork, joinery and parquet.

Exports from Peru to primarily China began for the parquet industry to supply the North American and European flooring market.

Freshly logged thick planks do not dry well naturally and have a tendency to warp, but planks to 13mm thick behave well when dried artificially slowly over a period of days in a kiln. The lumber is difficult to work as it is cross-grained and very hard, so it is best to use a bandsaw or other suitable power-tools. The lumber is naturally resistant to biological attack and does not need extra treatment.

=== Culture ===
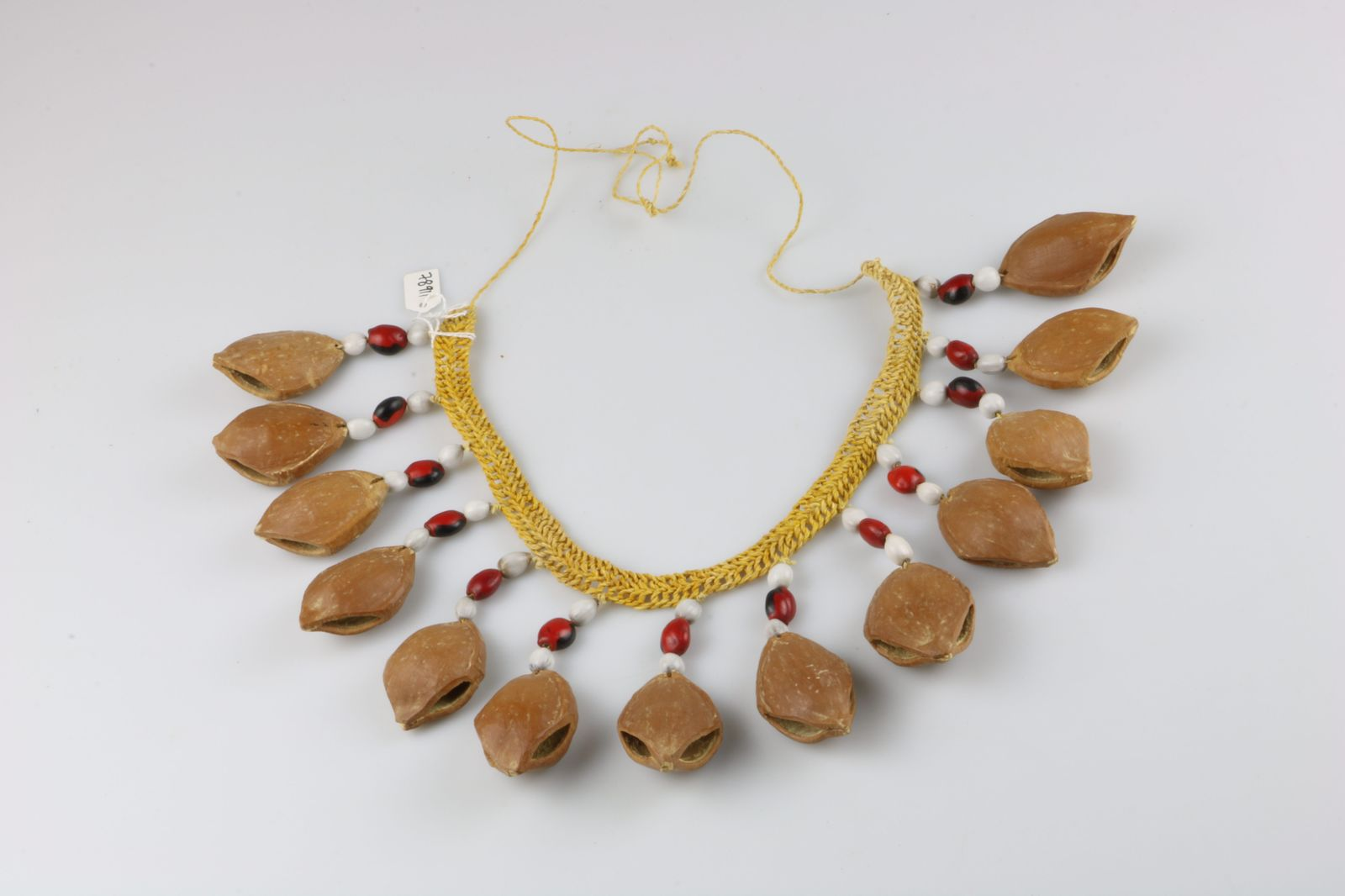
Necklace made with fruits of Dipteryx micrantha

Among the Ese Eja people, the plant is mixed with Banisteriopsis for use as an element in shamanistic rituals. According to Alexiades this is a recent non-indigenous practice. The tree is seen as a "teacher plant", and hallucinogenic visions of the tree symbolize concrete (houses) and the future/modernity.

== Conservation ==
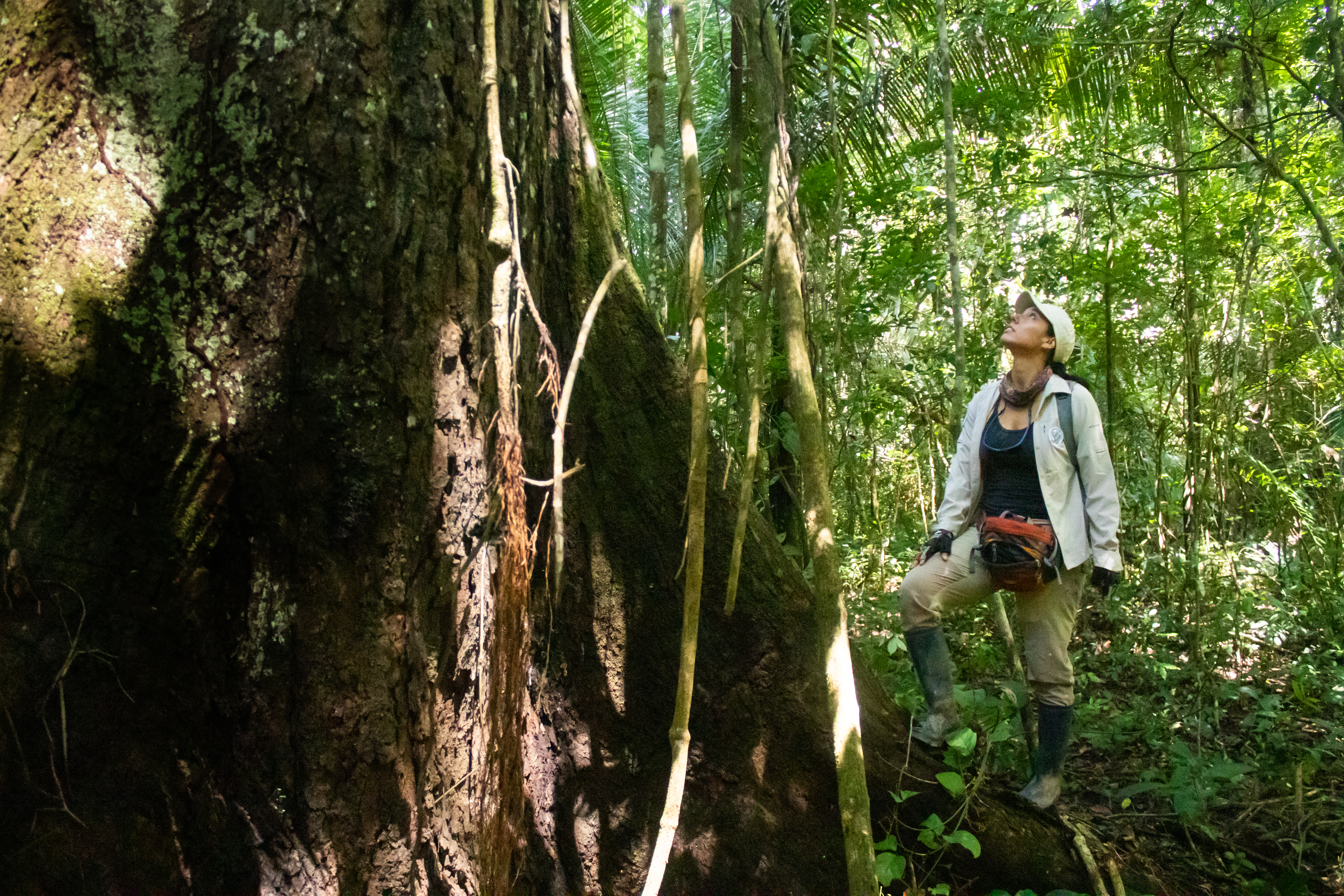
Peruvian researcher Tatiana Espinosa next to Dipteryx micrantha

In Bolivia it has been collected from Madidi National Park.

In Brazil, the conservation status of this species has not yet been evaluated by the Centro Nacional de Conservação da Flora. It is a common plant in Acre in forests on dry (not flooded) land.

In Colombia the conservation status is also yet to be evaluated. In can be seen in situ at Amacayacu National Park.

In Ecuador it is protected in Yasuní National Park.

In southeastern Peru this is a common species. In northeastern Amazonian Peru it is quite common and trees occur in medium to high densities. The conservation status has not been evaluated. It is protected in Manú National Park, Allpahuayo-Mishana National Reserve, Iparía National Forest, Bahuaja-Sonene National Park and Tambopata National Reserve. It is found in the buffer zones of El Sira Communal Reserve and Yanachaga-Chemillén National Park. It is also found outside of national parks.

Harvesting for timber appears to increase recruitment of this species due to better seedling survival, because of both the increase in gaps in the canopy, and protection by farmers moving into recently logged lands, although researchers warn about over-exploitation, the movement of poor farmers into the region and the subsequent development of logged land as infrastructure modernises in the region. Some form of agroforestry/silviculture appears quite possible with this species.

== Notes ==
The holotype was likely lost during the night of 1–2 March 1943 when an Allied bombing raid on the Berlin Botanical Garden destroyed many specimens. Thankfully a photograph survives in the USA.

MacBride in 1943 relates that the collector Tessmann says the fruit pulp is oily and edible, but according to Ducke in 1940, Tessmann was probably confused with the seeds. Modern Peruvian sources show Ducke was correct.
