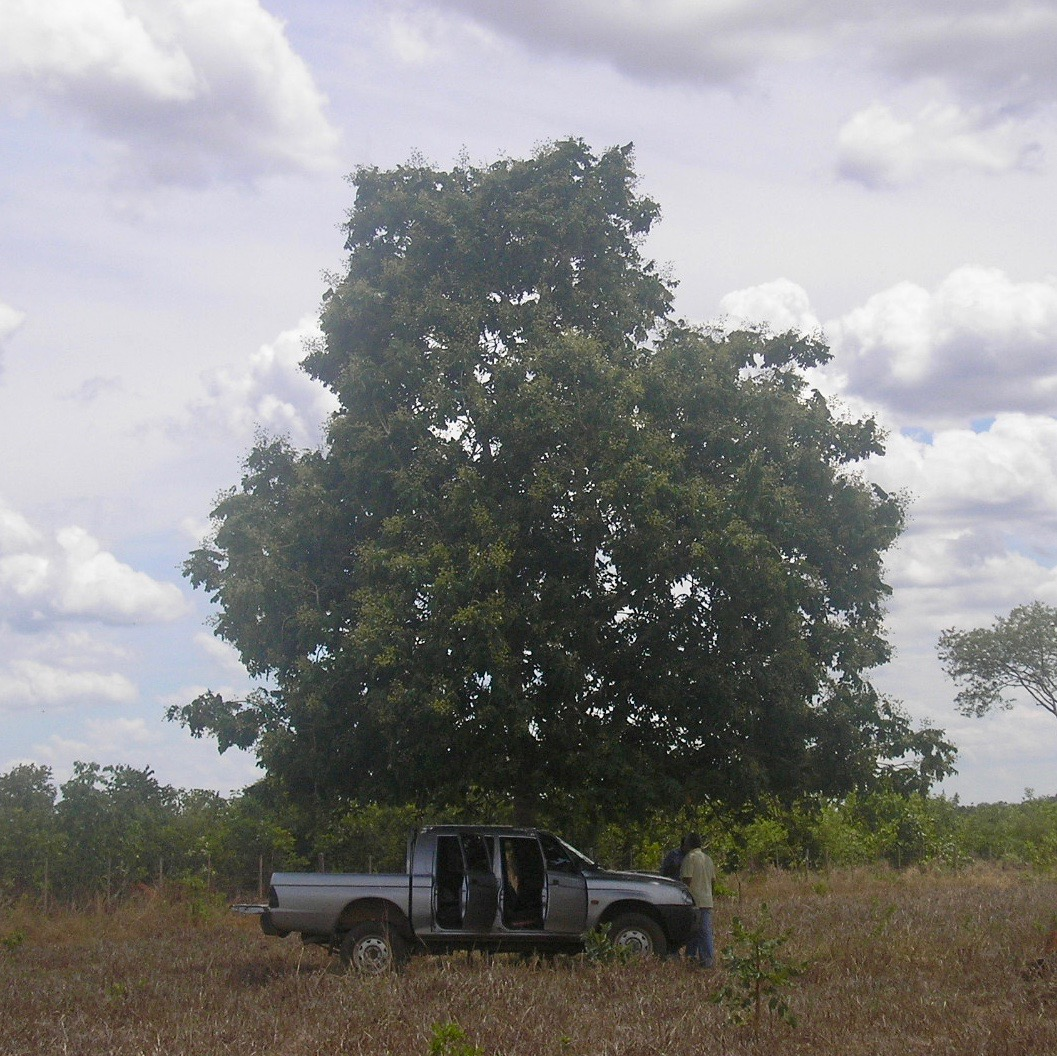
- Baru tree (Dipteryx alata)

Scientific classification
- Kingdom: Plantae
- Clade: Embryophytes
- Clade: Tracheophytes
- Clade: Spermatophytes
- Clade: Angiosperms
- Clade: Eudicots
- Clade: Rosids
- Order: Fabales
- Family: Fabaceae
- Subfamily: Faboideae
- Tribe: Dipterygeae
- Genus: Dipteryx; Schreb.

Species
- 12; see text

Synonyms
- Baryosma Gaertn. (1790), nom. rej.; Bolducia Neck. (1790), opus utique oppr.; Coumarouna Aubl. (1775), nom. rej.; Cumaruna J.F.Gmel. (1792), orth. var.; Heinzia Scop. (1777); Oleiocarpon Dwyer (1965)

= Dipteryx =

Genus of legumes

Dipteryx is a genus containing a number of species of large trees and possibly shrubs. It belongs to the "papilionoid" subfamily – Faboideae – of the family Fabaceae. This genus is native to South and Central America and the Caribbean. Formerly, the related genus Taralea was included in Dipteryx.

== Description ==
The largest members of Dipteryx are canopy-emergent trees of tropical rainforests. The tonka bean (D. odorata) is grown for its fragrant seeds. Baru (D. alata) is the only species which found in drier, seasonal areas, growing in the cerrado of Brazil; its fruit and seeds are used as food and fodder. Several species are used for timber, of which almendro (D. oleifera) wood is considered desirable, especially locally.

Dipteryx can be distinguished from other members of the Dipterygeae by its compound leaves with asymmetric leaflets caused due to an eccentric primary vein, a drupaceous fruit, seeds with a leathery skin, a hilum in a lateral or subapical position and a rugose embryo with a conspicuous plumule.

== Taxonomy ==
The number of recognised species of Dipteryx has changed over the years.

The genus was previously known as Coumarouna. In 1934 Walter Adolpho Ducke split this genus into two, on the basis of the alternate leaflets, among other characters, of Dipteryx. He used two older, conserved names published previously: Taralea and Dipteryx. Although Taralea was accepted, some taxonomists did not recognise Dipteryx as the correct name for the genus until at least the mid-1940s.

In the most recent monograph on the genus, A Checklist of the Dipterygeae species by the Brazilian researcher Haroldo Cavalcante de Lima in 1989, he synonymised a number of species, accepting nine species in the genus. His taxonomy was accepted by ILDIS (2005) but not noticed or followed by US databases, i.e. in GRIN (2005), the entry on Dipteryx in the Contribución al conocimiento de las leguminosas Colombianas by C. Barbosa (1994), the IUCN (1998) based on World List of Threatened Trees by Oldfield et al. (1998), or the Catalogue of the Flowering Plants and Gymnosperms of Peru (1993) which was built using the Tropicos database by the Missouri Botanical Garden. In 1999 the entry on Dipteryx in the Flora of the Venezuelan Guyana by de Lima was published.

The northernmost taxon Dipteryx panamensis, notable as being the only species listed on CITES since 2003 and therefore subject to export controls, was synonymised with the neglected but older name D. oleifera by de Lima in 1989, but this move was only followed by ILDIS and one or two of articles on the species over the years, all other floras, databases and publications using the name D. panamensis. In 2011, however, the Report of the Nomenclature Committee for Vascular Plants: 62 recommended D. oleifera by treated as validly published, and de Lima's synonymy for this taxon has been accepted by many.

By 2010, in the Catálogo de Plantas e Fungos do Brasil, de Lima had changed his mind and re-recognised two of Brazilian taxa he had earlier considered synonyms in 1989, although not all.

== Species ==
12 species are accepted:

- Dipteryx alata Vogel — Baru
- Dipteryx charapilla (J.F.Macbr.) Ducke was synonymised to D. rosea in 1989, but is now recognised as an independent species again.
- Dipteryx ferrea (Ducke) Ducke was synonymised to D. micrantha in 1989, but is now recognised as an independent species again.
- Dipteryx lacunifera Ducke
- Dipteryx magnifica (Ducke) Ducke
- Dipteryx micrantha Harms
- Dipteryx odorata (Aubl.) Forsyth f. — Tonka Bean
- Dipteryx oleifera Benth. — Almendro
- Dipteryx polyphylla Huber
- Dipteryx punctata (S.F.Blake) Amshoff
- Dipteryx rosea Spruce ex Benth.
- Dipteryx tetraphylla Benth.
