= Pterodon =

Pterodon may refer to:

- Pteranodon, a pterosaur, sometimes misspelled as "Pterodon"
- Pterodon (mammal), an extinct genus of hyaenodonts
- Pterodon (plant), a genus of legumes in the family Fabaceae
- Pterodon (company), a Czech game developer
