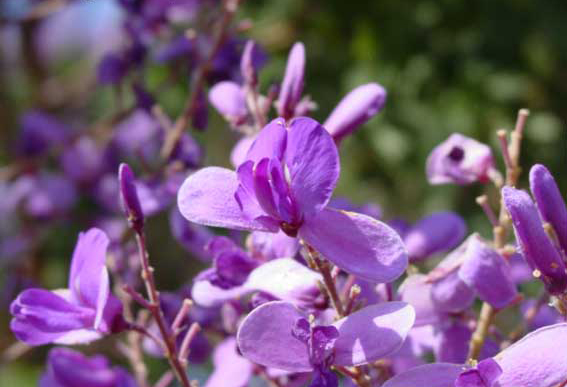

Scientific classification
- Kingdom: Plantae
- Clade: Tracheophytes
- Clade: Angiosperms
- Clade: Eudicots
- Clade: Rosids
- Order: Fabales
- Family: Fabaceae
- Subfamily: Faboideae
- Genus: Pterodon
- Species: P. emarginatus

Binomial name
- Pterodon emarginatus Vogel

Synonyms
- Acosmium inornatum (Mohlenbr.) Yakovlev; Commilobium polygalaeflorus Benth.; Commilobium pubescens Benth.; Pterodon apparicioi Pedersoli; Pterodon polygalaeflorus (Benth.) Benth; Pterodon polygaliflorus (Benth.) Benth.; Pterodon pubescens (Benth.) Benth.; Sweetia inornata Mohlenbr.

= Pterodon emarginatus =

Species of legume

Pterodon emarginatus (Portuguese: sucupira-branca) is a Brazilian legume of the Cerrado. Widely distributed in the west of Minas Gerais and in Goiás, Brazil, the fruit oil of this plant is used to deter skin penetration by the cercariae of Schistosoma.
