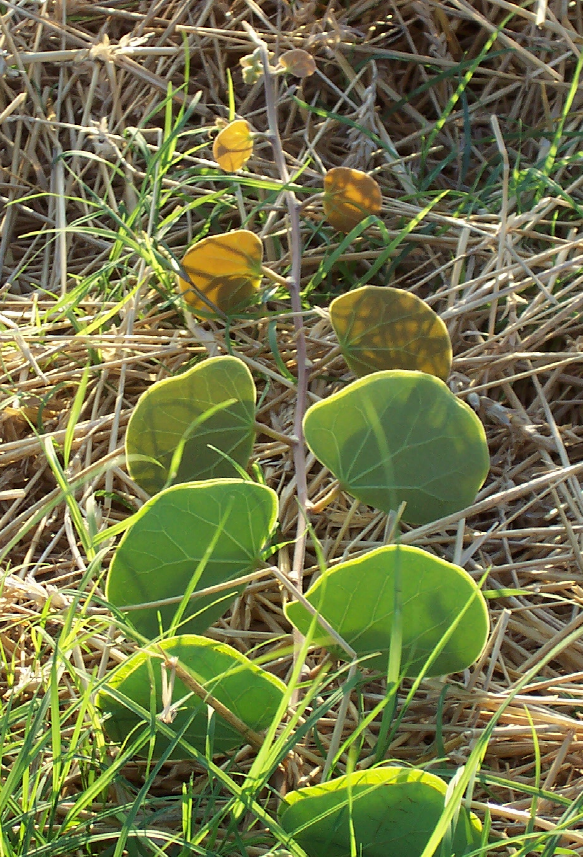

Scientific classification
- Kingdom: Plantae
- Clade: Tracheophytes
- Clade: Angiosperms
- Clade: Eudicots
- Clade: Rosids
- Order: Fabales
- Family: Fabaceae
- Genus: Tylosema
- Species: T. esculentum

Binomial name
- Tylosema esculentum (Burch.) A.Schreib.
- The range of Tylosema esculentum.

Synonyms
- Bauhinia bainesii Schinz; Bauhinia esculenta Burch.

= Tylosema esculentum =

Species of flowering plant

Tylosema esculentum, with common names gemsbok bean and marama bean or morama bean, is a long-lived perennial legume native to arid areas of southern Africa. Stems grow at least 3 metres (9.8 ft), in a prostrate or trailing form, with forked tendrils that facilitate climbing. A raceme up to 25 millimetres (1 in) long, containing many yellow-orange flowers, ultimately produces an ovate to circular pod, with large brownish-black seeds.

== Form ==
The marama bean is adapted to its native region of Southern Africa and therefore grows in dry and low-moisture soils. Its drought tolerance is accordingly high. The fact that the marama bean is adapted to harsh environments offers potential to extend the agricultural activity into regions which are dry or unproductive at the moment. Nevertheless, it needs to be investigated whether it can grow on different soil types. Summer growth is typically prodigious, particularly in plants older than one year, due in part to its large underground tuber. The plant is dormant over winter in its native home — South Africa, Namibia and Botswana — but might possibly remain evergreen in less harsh environments.

The nutritional value of the marama bean is astonishingly high for an unimproved legume. The tubers have a high protein content of 9.0% and also have a high amino acid content. The tubers of cassava, for comparison, only have a protein content of 1-3%, while yam has one of 7%. Also the grain is relatively high in protein with a share of 30-39%. The concentration of sulphur-containing amino acids is high as well (with a lysine content of 5.0% and a methionine content of 0.7%). This shows that the protein content of the seeds is comparable to the one of commercial soybeans, which have a content of 38-40%. Therefore, the potential of the marama bean is high to replace the soybean as a protein source, once there have been genetical improvements. The seeds develop in typical legume pods, albeit large and squat in shape, typically one or two seeds per pod.

The tuber can grow very large; commonly, at least 10 kg (22 lb), and often much larger. In Botswana, a tuber of 277 kg (611 lb) has been found.

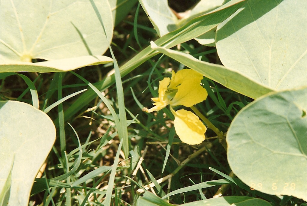
Marama flower

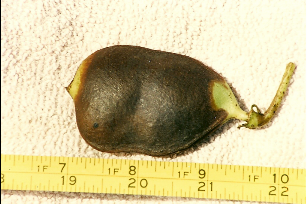
Marama fruit

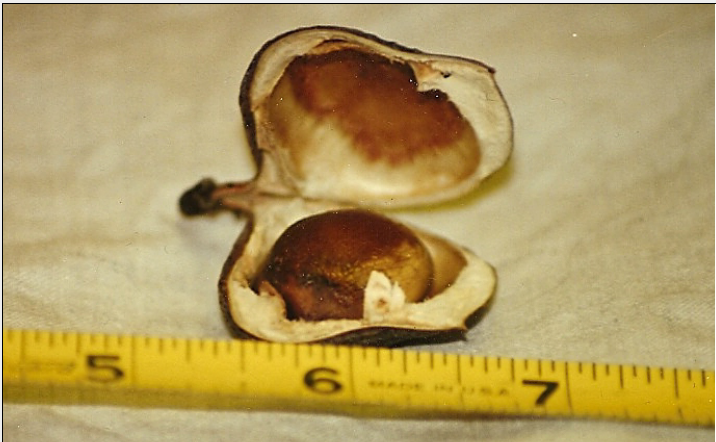
Marama seed in fruit

== Uses ==
The plant is a significant food-source for the people of the Kalahari Desert because of the high protein and oil content of its large seeds (20–30 g (0.71–1.06 oz) each). The seeds are usually roasted, imbuing them with a more palatable flavour, comparable to cashew or chestnut. The seeds can also be ground or boiled. The beans keep well, due to their hard outer shell. The tuber is also edible, but must be harvested from young plants (one or two years old) to avoid the tuber being astringent and fibrous.

The flour of Tylosema esculentum, prepared from heated or unheated marama beans, has a potential as a functional food ingredient. Although studies about its nutritional and physicochemical properties are lacking, the flour is protein-rich. Protein-based ingredients of marama bean are similar to those commercially available from soybean. Therefore, this flour has the potential to be used as a protein supplements in composite flours with cereals to improve the protein quality.

=== Marama milk ===
The milk of the marama bean is a creamy white water extract, very similar to dairy milk or soymilk. The milk can be consumed in the form of a refreshing and nutritious beverage just like dairy milk or soymilk. However, it is not available commercially.

This milk has high levels of sodium (47.9 mg/100 g) and iron (3.7 mg/100 g) compared to soymilk and dairy milk, with much a lower calcium content (6.8 mg/100 g).

In order to produce marama milk, several processing steps are involved: Thermal treatment (blanching and roasting of the beans), cracking, milling, suspending in water, boiling and filtration to obtain a milk-like phase.

=== Forage ===
The potential uses of the marama bean go beyond the role of only being a food plant. The foliage of the plant serves as forage for livestock and wildlife in Southern Africa because the leaves are highly palatable. Since the marama bean is used to grow in harsh environments it could be used as a feed crop in the drier parts of Africa. While using it as forage one does also protect the soil by conserving its moisture and preventing from soil erosion by wind and water. Furthermore, there would be a build-up in organic matter, which would be beneficial for soils which are poor in nutrients.

== Propagation ==
The seed's hard outer shell means that scarification is necessary in order to ensure satisfactory germination rates. As for most legumes, a pH neutral soil is preferred. The plant typically grows in very sandy loam, where waterlogging would not be a problem. Despite much global interest in this plant, propagation rates are still fairly low.

The plant can be grown outside, unsheltered, as far north as Zone 8 in the United States and perhaps further north; above-ground growth is killed back by winter freezing, but the plant reemerges each spring in late May. The greatest impediment to producing a crop of seeds is the long maturation time for the seed pods – which is right up to the first hard freeze of the year. Waterlogging is indeed an issue – leading to root rot – and a well-drained sandy loam is preferred, but not essential.

Curiously, this and the other three members of the genus Tylosema are possibly unique within the family Fabaceae in the fact they exhibit heterostyly. This reduces propagation potential, and obviously reduces seed production rates for cropping.

== Pests ==
It is known that two fungi are coinfecting the pods of marama beans leading to necrotic lesions. The fungi were revealed to be Alternaria tenuissima and Phoma spp. Insect pests could have been observed causing seed damage.

== Chemical and nutritional composition ==
It is most common to eat the marama beans as mature beans when the seeds are surrounded by a hard and woody seed coat, which has a reddish to brownish color. But the beans can also be eaten when they are still immature green beans.

=== Moisture ===
The marama bean has a very low moisture content as the dry matter content ranges from 93.4% to 98.7%. The moisture content may also vary due to external factors.

=== Lipids ===
It was reported that the content of lipids ranges between 24% and 42%. This high amount of lipids is an advantage, especially in Southern Africa where it helps improving the status of the undernourished people. The lipid content of the marama beans can be compared to sunflower seeds (22-36 %) and rapeseed (22-49 %) and almost reaching the amount that is found in peanuts (45-55 %). The amount of lipids is twice as high as found in soybeans (17-20 %).

=== Protein ===
The protein range of marama beans ranges from 29% to 39% on a dry matter basis. Thus, it is comparable or slightly higher to most other legumes. This amount of protein makes the marama bean a great nutritive food but can be also used as a protein-rich ingredient for supplementing other products.

== Local and community uses ==
Tylosema esculentum, also known as the Marama bean, is a perennial legume that grows in arid Southern African environments. Indigenous natural food sources, such as this specific perennial legume, are essential for rural livelihoods, especially for communities living in extremely harsh environmental conditions where there is little to no rainfall. The plant's ability to be cultivated in harsh and arid environments is due to its large tuber structure that stores high amount of water and soil nutrients, making Tylosema esculentum a drought-tolerant crop. Many families of Southern African regions grow the Marama bean locally, but are unaware of its high nutritional value.

Sixteen samples of Tylosema esculentum from Botswana, Namibia, and South Africa were tested, and the plant's chemical composition was analyzed. The results showed that the Marama bean seeds contained high lipid and protein levels (29-38% protein content, 32-42% lipid content, and 19-27% dietary fiber content), which are higher in value than other legumes. Tylosema esculentum can also be used for other nutritional sources such as for oil, milk, and flour. After learning more about the benefits of nutrition of this perennial legume, many families hope to have the Marama bean as part of the commercial market in order to stabilize food security and improve food diversity.

== Scarification and seed germination ==
Tylosema esculentum have hard seed coats, which lead to many ecological benefits such as an accumulation of seed banks in soils and a higher percentage of germinating, establishing, and completing a successful life cycle. In order to optimize germination and growth of this perennial legume and increase its importance in the food market, germination behavior of untreated Tylosema esculentum seeds compared to seeds undergoing various dormancy-breaking treatments was investigated. The results indicated that seed germination was greatest when scratching and cracking of the seed coat with sandpaper, also known as mechanical scarification, was applied. Other types of scarification include immersion of seed in water or acid.

Another experiment in Greece discovered that the seed germination of Tylosema esculentum increases significantly in speed and emergence when the seeds are immersed in hot water for two to four minutes or dry heating for five minutes at 100 to 150 degrees Celsius. Soil is also an important factor to consider when growing this perennial legume plant. Tylosema esculentum grows best in a sandy soil texture, instead of a clay loam soil texture, because a sandy soil has optimal physical properties that allow the Marama bean to germinate quickly.

== Heterostyly and its evolutionary significance ==
Tylosema esculentum is heterostylous, meaning that two or three morphological types of flowers exist in the population. For this specific legume, its pistil and anthers show reciprocal heights in two morphological types. Experiments involving in vivo fertilization (naturally occurring crosses of living organisms) and in vitro fertilization (crosses done in a laboratory setting) indicated that a two-allele self-incompatibility system exists in Tylosema esculentum. Having a successful self-incompatibility system evolutionarily benefits this plant because it promotes more out-crossing and in turn creates more diversity within a population. Diversity in a population is important and beneficial because the population has a stronger defense against a lethal or harmful virus or bacteria infecting the entire population. The evolutionary significance of Tylosema esculentum is that the discovery of the function heterostylous plant was the first in the family Fabaceae.
