= Monopteryx =

Scientific classification
- Kingdom: Plantae
- Clade: Embryophytes
- Clade: Tracheophytes
- Clade: Angiosperms
- Clade: Eudicots
- Clade: Rosids
- Order: Fabales
- Family: Fabaceae
- Subfamily: Faboideae
- Tribe: Dipterygeae
- Genus: Monopteryx; Spruce ex Benth. (1862)

Species
- Monopteryx angustifolia Spruce ex Benth.; Monopteryx inpae W.A.Rodrigues; Monopteryx uaucu Spruce ex Benth.

Genus of legumes

Monopteryx is a genus of flowering plants in the family Fabaceae. It includes three species of trees native to the Amazon rainforest of northern South America, ranging through parts of Colombia, Venezuela, northern Brazil, and French Guiana. They grow in non-inundated lowland tropical rain forest on sandy soil. The genus belongs to subfamily Faboideae. Members of this genus produce hydroxypipecolic acids in their leaves.

Monopteryx can be distinguished from other members of the Dipterygeae by the fact that:

the two adaxial sepals are almost completely united and cover the floral bud.
