= 4-Hydroxycoumarin synthase =

Class of enzymes

4-hydroxycoumarin synthase

Identifiers
- EC no.: 2.3.1.208

Databases
- IntEnz: IntEnz view
- BRENDA: BRENDA entry
- ExPASy: NiceZyme view
- KEGG: KEGG entry
- MetaCyc: metabolic pathway
- PRIAM: profile
- PDB structures: RCSB PDB PDBe PDBsum
Search
- PMC: articles
- PubMed: articles
- NCBI: proteins

4-hydroxycoumarin synthase (EC 2.3.1.208, BIS2, BIS3) is an enzyme with systematic name malonyl-CoA:2-hydroxybenzoyl-CoA malonyltransferase. This enzyme catalyses the following chemical reaction

malonyl-CoA + 2-hydroxybenzoyl-CoA $\rightleftharpoons$ 2 CoA + 4-hydroxycoumarin + CO_{2}

This polyketide synthase can also accept benzoyl-CoA as substrate.
