= Samuel Gawith & Co. =

British tobacco and snuff manufacturer

- Type: Private company
- Industry: Tobacco manufacturing
- Founded: 1792 (origins)
- Founder: Thomas Harrison
- Fate: Acquired by Gawith Hoggarth & Co. in 2015
- Successor: Gawith Hoggarth & Co.
- Area served: Worldwide
- Products: Pipe tobacco, snuff, cigarettes, cigars
- Website: https://www.gawithhoggarth.ltd/

Samuel Gawith & Co. was a British tobacco and snuff manufacturing company based in Kendal, Cumbria, England. The company traced its origins to the late eighteenth century and was one of the oldest continuously operating tobacco manufacturers in Cumbria. For much of its history it specialised in traditional pipe tobaccos, hand-twisted tobaccos, and nasal snuffs produced using historic manufacturing methods.

The company became internationally known among pipe smokers for preserving nineteenth-century production techniques and operating machinery that dated back to the Industrial Revolution. Its products were exported throughout Europe, North America, Asia, and Oceania.

In 2015 the business and goodwill of Samuel Gawith were acquired by Gawith Hoggarth & Co., reuniting two branches of the Gawith tobacco family after more than a century of separate operation.

== Origins ==
The origins of the company date to 1792 when tobacco merchant and snuff manufacturer Thomas Harrison established a snuff business in Kendal. Harrison had learned tobacco-processing techniques in Scotland before returning to Westmorland with equipment for grinding tobacco into snuff.

The business initially operated from a water-powered mill outside Kendal. Tobacco leaves were processed into finely ground snuff before being transported into the town for flavouring, packaging, and sale.

Through marriage and inheritance, ownership of the enterprise passed to Samuel Gawith during the early nineteenth century. Under his leadership the company expanded beyond snuff production and began manufacturing pipe tobacco and other tobacco products.

== Expansion in the nineteenth century ==
By the mid-nineteenth century Samuel Gawith had become one of the leading tobacco manufacturers in northern England. The company established production facilities in Kendal and developed a reputation for producing high-quality tobacco blends.

Following the death of Samuel Gawith in 1865, the business passed to his sons. Internal disagreements eventually led to the division of the family enterprise. Separate tobacco concerns emerged, including the companies that later became known as Samuel Gawith and Gawith Hoggarth.

In 1881 a new factory known as the Kendal Brown House was established. The building became closely associated with the company's snuff manufacturing operations and remained an important part of the business for over a century.

== Twentieth century ==
During the early twentieth century the company experienced significant growth. Demand for tobacco products increased during the First World War, particularly for snuff, which remained popular among soldiers and civilians alike.

In 1920 the company opened a modern factory on Sandes Avenue in Kendal and transferred machinery from older water-powered facilities. Despite modernisation, much of the manufacturing process remained labour-intensive and relied upon traditional methods.

Throughout the 1920s and 1930s the company produced dozens of tobacco and snuff brands. However, the increasing popularity of manufactured cigarettes created challenges for smaller tobacco firms. In response, Samuel Gawith concentrated its efforts on specialist products such as pipe tobacco and premium snuff.

The company survived both World Wars and continued operating as an independent manufacturer throughout most of the twentieth century.

== International reputation ==
By the late twentieth century Samuel Gawith had developed a loyal international customer base. Collectors and pipe-smoking enthusiasts regarded the company as one of the last producers of traditional British pipe tobaccos.

The firm's production methods attracted particular attention. Many products continued to be manufactured using machinery dating from the eighteenth and nineteenth centuries. This approach limited production capacity but helped preserve distinctive manufacturing characteristics associated with the company's historic tobacco blends.

Exports became increasingly important to the business, particularly in North America and continental Europe, where several Samuel Gawith blends achieved cult status among pipe smokers.

== Acquisition ==
In 2015 the business and intellectual property of Samuel Gawith were acquired by Gawith Hoggarth & Co., another Kendal-based tobacco manufacturer descended from the same family tradition.

The acquisition effectively reunited the two historic Gawith tobacco companies after more than 130 years of separate operation. Production of the Samuel Gawith brand continued under the ownership of Gawith Hoggarth.

The legal entity Samuel Gawith & Company Limited was dissolved in 2017.

== Products ==
Samuel Gawith produced a wide range of tobacco products, including:

- Pipe tobacco
- Flake tobacco
- Rope tobacco
- Twist tobacco
- Nasal snuff
- Cigarettes
- Cigars

Among its best-known products were traditional English pipe tobacco blends and the Kendal Brown range of snuffs.

== Manufacturing ==
The company became notable for its continued use of historic industrial equipment. Several machines employed in the production process dated to the eighteenth century and remained in regular use into the twenty-first century.

Production methods emphasised slow pressing, natural ageing, and traditional blending techniques. These practices distinguished Samuel Gawith products from many mass-produced tobacco brands.

== Legacy ==
Samuel Gawith is widely regarded as one of the most historically significant names in British tobacco manufacturing. Together with Gawith Hoggarth, the company formed part of Kendal's long-standing tobacco industry, which dates back more than two centuries.

The Samuel Gawith brand continues to be produced and sold internationally, preserving many of the recipes and manufacturing traditions developed by the company during the nineteenth century.

== See also ==
- Kendal
- Pipe tobacco
- Snuff (tobacco)
