= Taralea =

- Taralea cordata in Colombia

Scientific classification
- Kingdom: Plantae
- Clade: Tracheophytes
- Clade: Angiosperms
- Clade: Eudicots
- Clade: Rosids
- Order: Fabales
- Family: Fabaceae
- Subfamily: Faboideae
- Tribe: Dipterygeae
- Genus: Taralea; Aubl.

Species
- Taralea cordata Ducke; Taralea crassifolia (Benth.) Ducke; Taralea oppositifolia Aubl.; Taralea reticulata (Benth.) Ducke; Taralea speciosa (Ducke) C.S.Carvalho, D.B.O.S.Cardoso & H.C.Lima

Genus of legumes

Taralea is a genus of flowering plants in the family Fabaceae. It includes five species of trees and shrubs native to northern South America, ranging from Colombia and Peru to Venezuela, the Guianas, and northern and northeastern Brazil. Habitats include riverine and inundated tropical lowland rain forest, seasonally dry forest (sometimes on white sand), woodland, and marsh. One or two species are also found in montane forest and in open moist woodland and scrub on sandstone-derived soils. It belongs to subfamily Faboideae.

Taralea can be distinguished from other members of tribe Dipterygeae by:

a black and rugose petiolule; an elliptical, hairy ovary; a legume with elastic dehiscence; a circular, oval, compressed seed with a basal hilum; and an embryo that displays a cleft below the radical–hypocotyl axis and an inconspicuous plumule.
