= 4-Hydroxycoumarin =

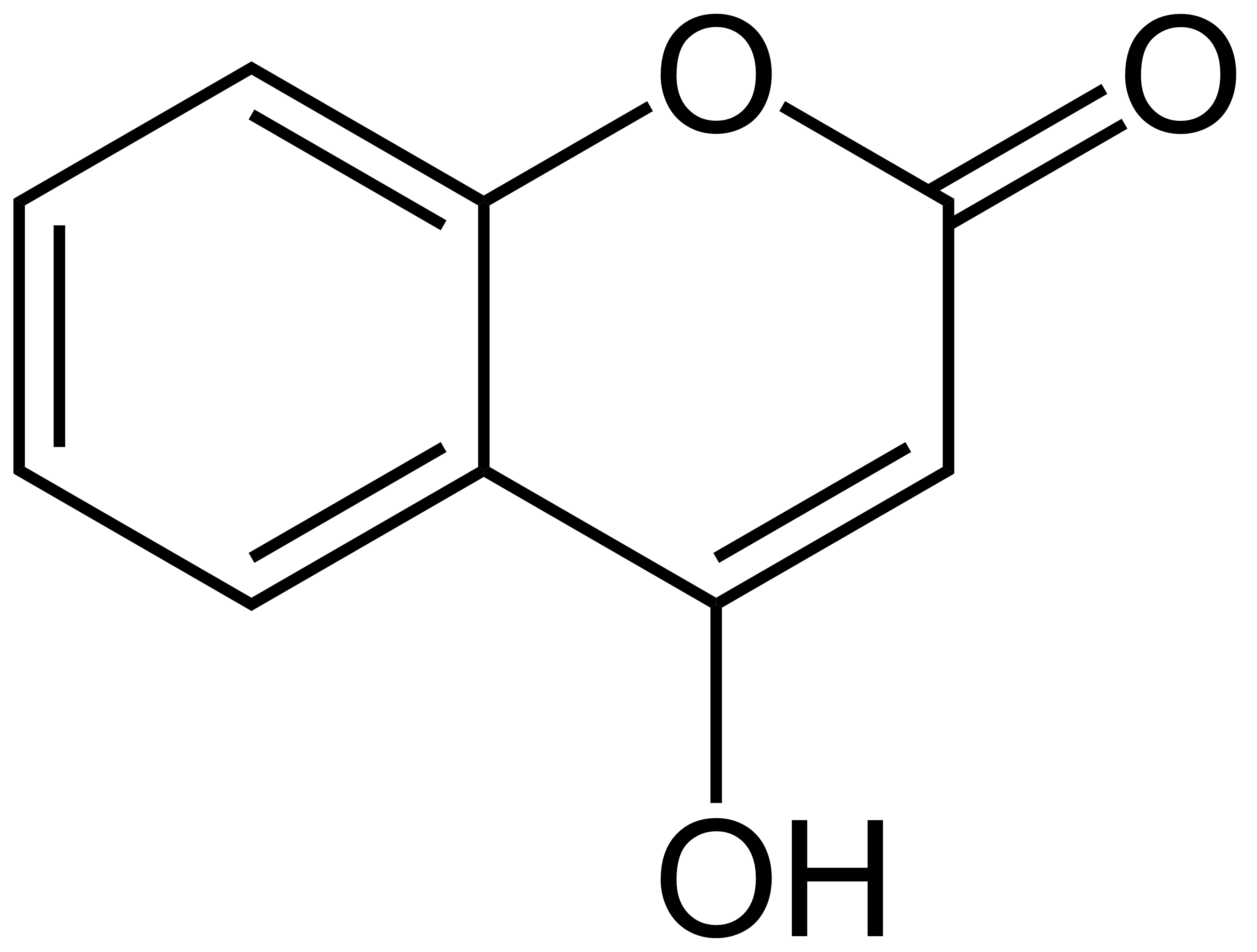
- Chemical structure of 4-hydroxycoumarin

Names
- Preferred IUPAC name 4-Hydroxy-2H-1-benzopyran-2-one
- Other names 4-Coumarinol; Benzotetronic acid

Identifiers
CAS Number	1076-38-6
3D model (JSmol)	Interactive image
ChEMBL	ChEMBL301141
ChemSpider	10254753
ECHA InfoCard	100.012.783
PubChem CID	54682930
UNII	X954ZLL2RD
CompTox Dashboard (EPA)	DTXSID8061472
- InChI: InChI=1S/C9H6O3/c10-7-5-9(11)12-8-4-2-1-3-6(7)8/h1-5,10H Key: VXIXUWQIVKSKSA-UHFFFAOYSA-N; InChI=1/C9H10O2/c10-7-1-2-8-3-5-9(11)6-4-8/h1-6,10-11H,7H2/b2-1+ Key: PTNLHDGQWUGONS-OWOJBTEDBL
- SMILES: Oc1ccc(/C=C/CO)cc1

Properties
Chemical formula	C_{9}H_{6}O_{3}
Molar mass	162.144 g·mol^{−1}
- Except where otherwise noted, data are given for materials in their standard state (at 25 °C [77 °F], 100 kPa). verify (what is ?) Infobox references

4-Hydroxycoumarin is a coumarin derivative with a hydroxy group at the 4-position.

== Occurrence ==
4-Hydroxycoumarin is an important fungal metabolite from the precursor coumarin, and its production leads to further fermentative production of the natural anticoagulant dicoumarol. This happens in the presence of naturally occurring formaldehyde, which allows attachment of a second 4-hydroxycoumarin molecule through the linking carbon of the formaldehyde, to the 3-position of the first 4-hydroxycoumarin molecule, to give the semi-dimer the motif of the drug class. Dicoumarol appears as a fermentation product in spoiled sweet clover silages and is considered a mycotoxin.

4-Hydroxycoumarin is biosynthesized from malonyl-CoA and 2-hydroxybenzoyl-CoA by the enzyme 4-hydroxycoumarin synthase.

== Anticoagulants ==
After the identification of dicoumarol and its anticoagulant activity, it became the prototype for a class of drugs. 4-Hydroxycoumarin forms the core of the chemical structure of anticoagulants known collectively as 4-hydroxycoumarins. They include, for example, warfarin, a pharmaceutical drug used to prevent formation of blood clots, and brodifacoum, a widely used rodenticide.

== See also ==
- Coumarin
- Dicumarol
