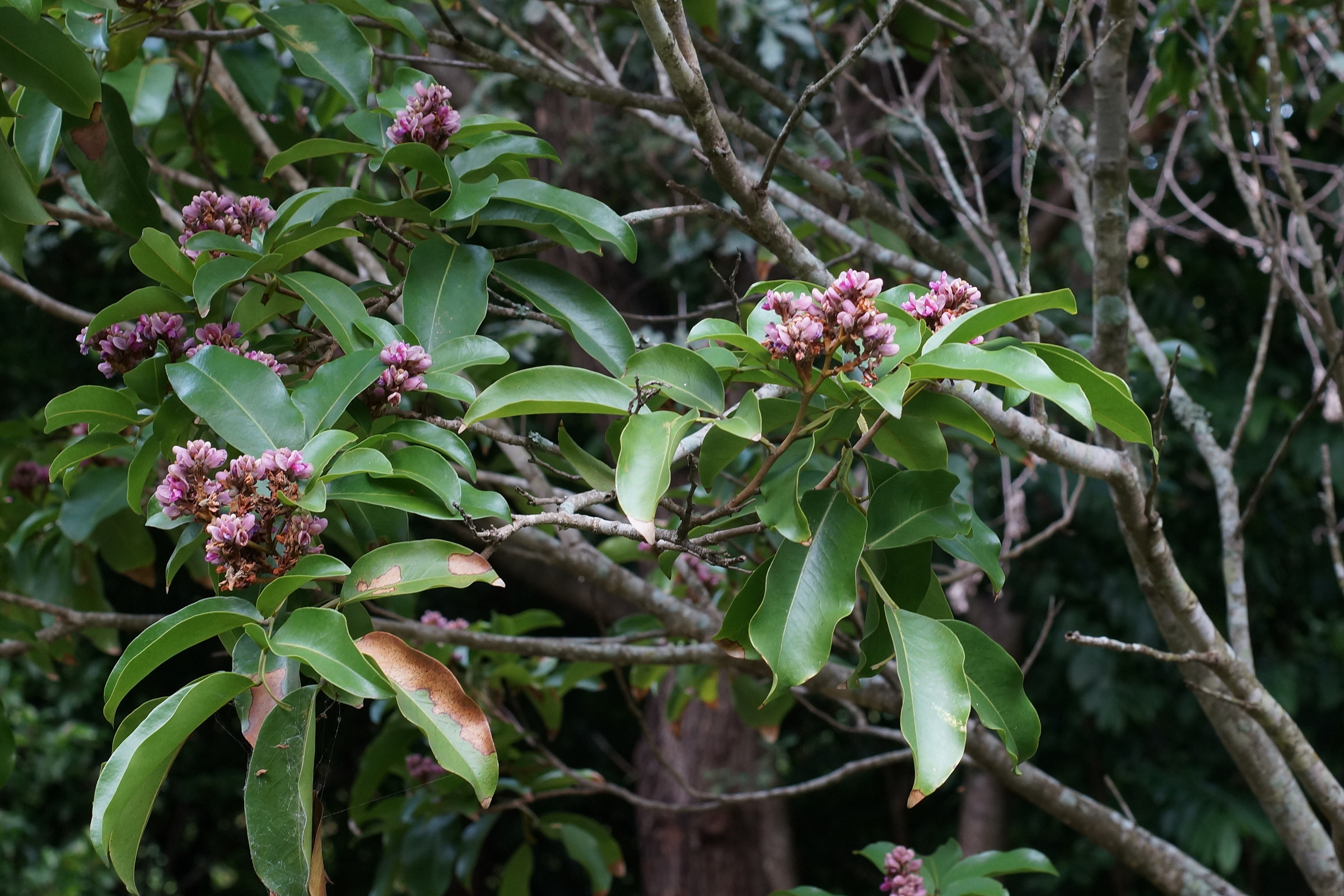

Conservation status
- Data Deficient (IUCN 3.1)

Scientific classification
- Kingdom: Plantae
- Clade: Tracheophytes
- Clade: Angiosperms
- Clade: Eudicots
- Clade: Rosids
- Order: Fabales
- Family: Fabaceae
- Subfamily: Faboideae
- Genus: Dipteryx
- Species: D. odorata

Binomial name
- Dipteryx odorata (Aubl.) Willd.

Synonyms
- Coumarouna odorata Aubl. Coumarouna tetraphylla (Benth.) Aubl. Dipteryx tetraphylla Benth.

= Dipteryx odorata =

Species of flowering tree in the pea family

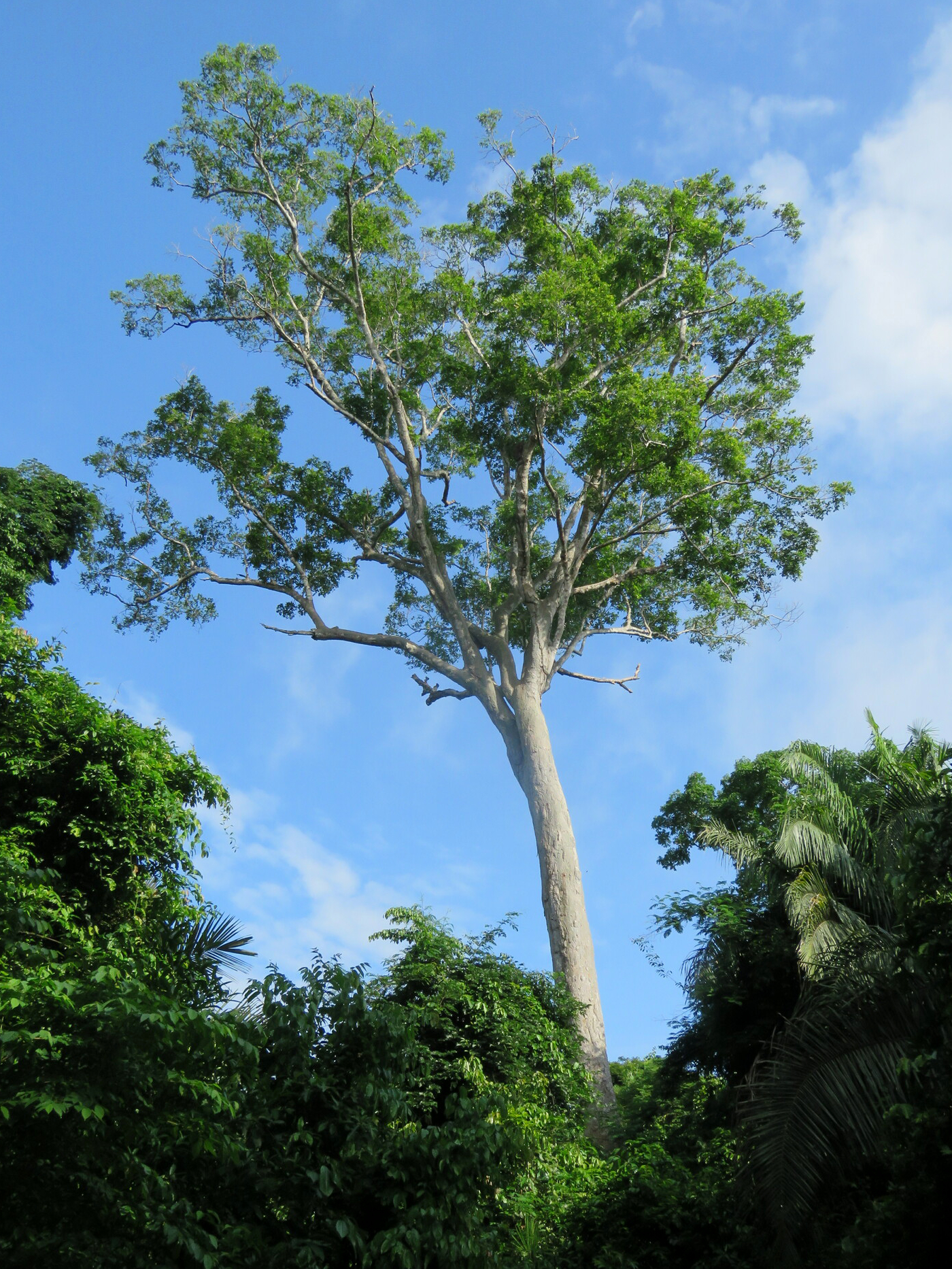
Dipteryx odorata

Dipteryx odorata (commonly known as "cumaru", "kumaru", or "Brazilian teak") is a species of flowering tree in the pea family, Fabaceae. The tree is native to Northern South America and is semi-deciduous. Its seeds are known as tonka beans, sometimes spelled tonkin beans or tonquin beans (not related to Tonkin). The seeds are black and wrinkled and have a smooth, brown interior. They have a strong fragrance similar to that of sweet woodruff due to their high content of coumarin.

The word tonka is taken from the Galibi (Carib) tongue spoken by natives of French Guiana; it also appears in Tupi, another language of the same region, as the name of the tree. The old genus name, Coumarouna, was formed from another Tupi name for the tree, kumaru.

Many anticoagulant prescription drugs, such as warfarin, are based on 4-hydroxycoumarin, a chemical derivative of coumarin initially isolated from spoiled sweet clover silage and producible from this bean. Coumarin itself, however, does not have anticoagulant properties.

== Biology of the tree ==
The tree grows up to 25–30 m (82–98 ft), with a trunk of up to 1 m (3 ft 3 in) in diameter. The tree bark is smooth and gray, whereas the wood is red. The tree has alternate pinnate leaves with three to six leaflets, leathery, glossy and dark green, and pink flowers. Each developed fruit contains one seed. D. odorata is pollinated by insects. The worst pests are bats because they eat the pulpy flesh of the fruit. A few known fungi may cause problems: Anthostomella abdita, Diatrype ruficarnis, Macrophoma calvuligera and Myiocopron cubense.

Radio-carbon dating of D. odorata stumps left by a large logging operation near Manaus by Niro Higuchi, Jeffrey Chambers, and Joshua Schimel, showed that it was one of around 100 species which definitely live to over 1,000 years (specifically an age of 1400 years being claimed for this and the unrelated Cariniana macrantha). Until their research, it had been assumed unlikely that any Amazonian tree could live to old age due to the conditions of the rain forest.

== Seeds ==
The tonka seed contains coumarin, a chemical isolate named after the plant. The seeds normally contain about 1–3% of coumarin, but can rarely achieve levels up to 10%. Coumarin is responsible for the seed's pleasant odor and is used in the perfume industry. Coumarin is bitter to the taste. In large infused doses, it may cause hemorrhages, liver damage, or paralysis of the heart. It is therefore controlled as a food additive by many governments. Like a number of other plants, the tonka bean plant probably produces coumarin as a defense chemical.

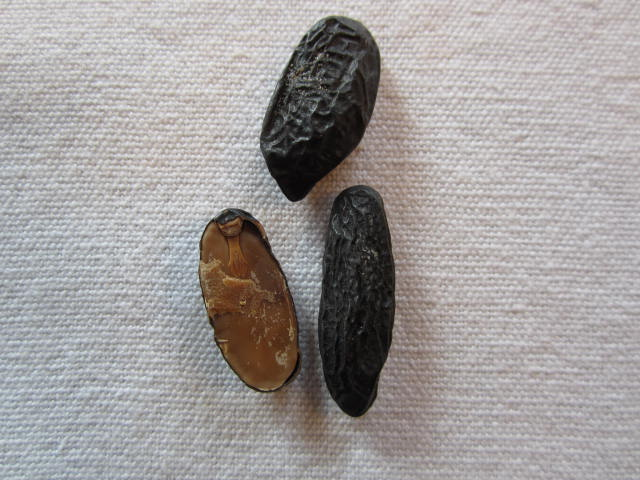
The smooth brown inside of the tonka bean

=== Uses ===
Tonka beans have been used as a source of natural coumarin and, after its synthesis in the 1940s, artificial coumarin became one of the first artificial flavoring agents as a vanilla substitute. The Food and Drug Administration in the United States has considered foods containing tonka beans adulterated since 1954 because coumarin has shown toxicity in extremely high concentrations. Despite the American ban on its use in foods, the product has been frequently imported into the US by gastronomic enthusiasts. There have been calls for removing the restrictions on the use of tonka beans in food in the US similar to the successful deregulations of mangosteens and absinthe in the early 21st century. The regulations are criticized as unreasonable due to the unlikelihood of consuming enough coumarin to cause ill effects and due to the presence of coumarin in unregulated foods. Coumarin is also present in lavender, cinnamon, licorice, strawberries, and cherries.

In France, tonka beans are used in cuisine (particularly, in desserts and stews) and in perfumes. The flavor has been described as a complex mix of vanilla, almond, clove, cinnamon, and amaretto. Yves Rocher uses them in their men's perfume Hoggar, for example, and they are still used to flavor some pipe tobaccos, such as Samuel Gawith "1792 Flake".

Many anticoagulant prescription drugs, such as warfarin, are based on 4-hydroxycoumarin, a chemical derivative of coumarin initially isolated from this bean. Coumarin, however, does not have anticoagulant properties.

== Cultivation ==
Today, the main producers of tonka beans are Venezuela and Nigeria. The cumaru tree is a light-demanding calcifuge tree which grows on poor, well-drained soils. The best growth is reached on fertile soils rich in humus. In the native region there is a mean annual temperature of 25 °C (77 °F) and about 2,000 mm (80 in) rainfall per year, with a dry season from June to November. In general, it has a very low plant density, but depending on the agricultural use, the density and the age of the trees diversify. In seed production systems, the plant density is higher and the trees are older than in timber production systems. The tree flowers from March to May, and the fruits ripen from June to July. So, the fresh fruits are picked up in June and July, and fallen pods are harvested from January to March or sometimes earlier. The hard outer shell is removed and the beans are spread out for two to three days to dry, after which they can be sold. The major producer is Venezuela, followed by Brazil and Colombia. The most important importing country is the US, where it is used especially in the tobacco industry.

== Social aspects ==
This species is well known locally and generates an important income for rural families, particularly as a buffer in times of hardship. It is used for timber and nontimber products. The yield of beans per tree is about 1.0–3.5 kg (2.2–7.7 lb) per year, but cumaru trees produce a large volume of seeds every four years.
