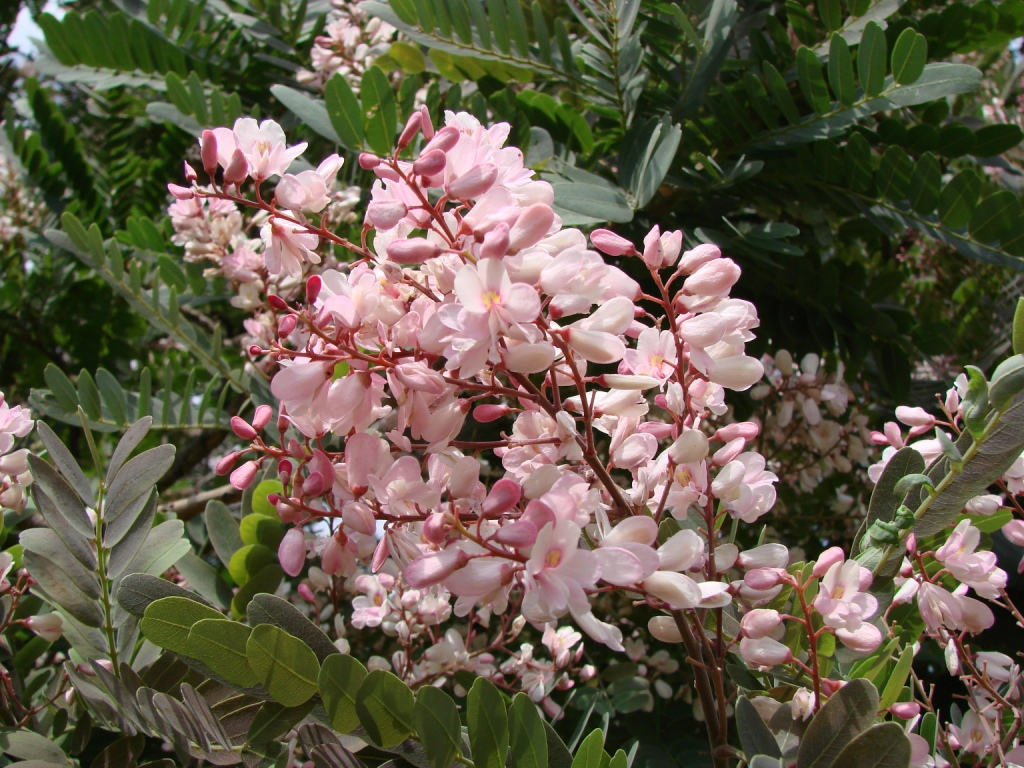
- Pterodon pubescens

Scientific classification
- Kingdom: Plantae
- Clade: Tracheophytes
- Clade: Angiosperms
- Clade: Eudicots
- Clade: Rosids
- Order: Fabales
- Family: Fabaceae
- Subfamily: Faboideae
- Clade: ADA clade
- Tribe: Dipterygeae; Polhill

Type genus
- Dipteryx Schreb.

Synonyms
- Dipteryxeae; Dipterygeae clade Cardoso et al. 2012

= Dipterygeae =

Tribe of legumes

The tribe Dipterygeae is one of the subdivisions of the plant family Fabaceae. It was recently recircumscribed to include the following genera:

- Dipteryx Schreb.
- Monopteryx Spruce ex Benth.
- Pterodon Vogel
- Taralea Aubl.

This clade does not currently have a node-based, phylogenetic definition. A synapomorphy that unites the members of this tribe is "an unusual two-lipped calyx in which the two upper lobes are much enlarged and the three lower lobes are reduced to small teeth." Members of the Dipterygeae, as well as species found in its sister group, Amburaneae, are known to produce a variety of resins (balsams, coumarins, etc.).
