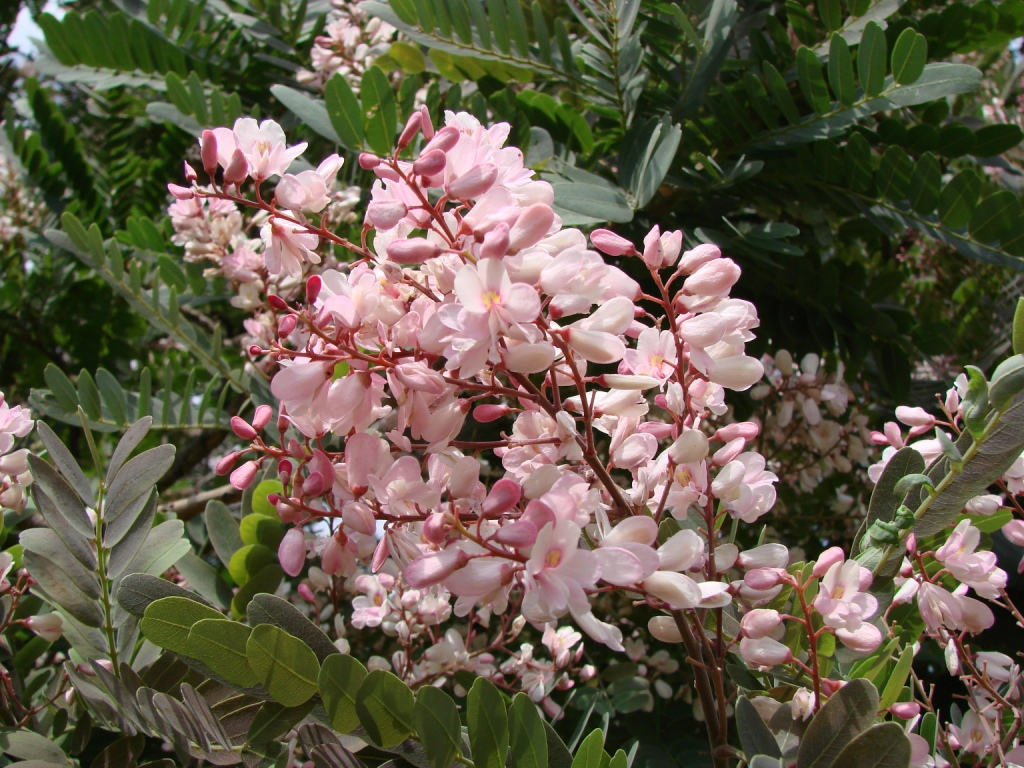
- Pterodon emarginatus

Scientific classification
- Kingdom: Plantae
- Clade: Tracheophytes
- Clade: Angiosperms
- Clade: Eudicots
- Clade: Rosids
- Order: Fabales
- Family: Fabaceae
- Subfamily: Faboideae
- Tribe: Dipterygeae
- Genus: Pterodon; Vogel (1837)

Species
- Four; see text

Synonyms
- Commilobium Benth. (1837)

= Pterodon (plant) =

Genus of legumes

Pterodon is a genus of flowering plants in the legume family, Fabaceae. It includes four species of trees native to Brazil and Bolivia. Typical habitats include seasonally-dry tropical forest, woodland (cerrado), and thorn shrubland (caatinga), often on rocky outcrops. It belongs to the subfamily Faboideae.

Pterodon can be distinguished from other members of the Dipterygeae as follows:

the leaf rachis is exalate, the fruit is a cryptosamara with oil glands in the epicarp, the seed testa is smooth and the raphe is apparent, with the hilum in a lateral position covered by an aril and a smooth embryo.

== Species ==
Four species are accepted:

- Pterodon abruptus (Moric.) Benth.
- Pterodon apparicioi Pedersoli
- Pterodon emarginatus Vogel
- Pterodon pubescens (Benth.) Benth.
