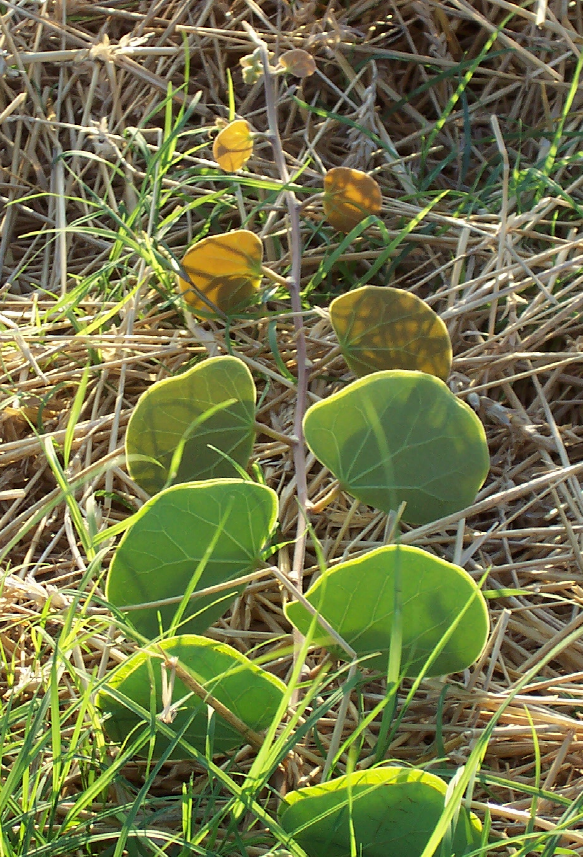
- Marama bean

Scientific classification
- Kingdom: Plantae
- Clade: Embryophytes
- Clade: Tracheophytes
- Clade: Spermatophytes
- Clade: Angiosperms
- Clade: Eudicots
- Clade: Rosids
- Order: Fabales
- Family: Fabaceae
- Subfamily: Cercidoideae
- Tribe: Bauhinieae
- Genus: Tylosema (Schweinf.) Torre & Hillc.

Type species
- Tylosema fassoglensis (Kotschy ex Schweinf.) Torre & Hillc.

Species
- 4–5; see text
- The range of Tylosema.

= Tylosema =

Genus of legumes

The genus Tylosema is in the plant family Fabaceae and encompasses four accepted species of perennial legumes native to southern and central Africa. These are semi-woody viniferous plants broadly distributed from Sudan and Ethiopia south to Angola and South Africa. Coetzer and Ross originally described four Tylosema species.

== Species ==
There are four documented species within the genus Tylosema (Schweinf.) Torre & Hillc.:

- Tylosema argentea (Chiov.) Brenan
- Tylosema esculentum (Burch.) A.Schreib.—Marama bean
- Tylosema fassoglense (Kotschy ex Schweinf.) Torre & Hillc.
- Tylosema humifusa (Pichi-Serm. & Roti-Michel) Brenan

Proposed species:

- Tylosema angolense P.Silveira & S.Castro

== Common names ==
Creeping bauhinia (English), Gwangwandiza (Shona), Marama bean, gemsbok bean, tamani berry (English), Morama bean, gami (Khoi), Mubopo (Shona), Mutukutupasi (Shona), Umbama or Umdabule (Ndebele).

== Habitat ==
Habitat for Tylosema species is diverse and particular to each species. T. esculentum is found mostly on sandy plains, while T. fassoglense can be found from open grassland to desert to woodlands to roadsides. All species are found from low to moderate altitude.

Tylosema species grow in mostly sandy soils with low rainfall and can tolerate scorching heat and long-term drought. Typical daily high temperatures average 37 °C during growing season and radiation frequently exceeds 2000 μmol m^{−2} s^{−1}. Whereas many legumes can fix atmospheric nitrogen, all Tylosema species are non-nodulating.

Vegetation is a climbing vine, with some species reaching up to 6 m long. Herbaceous stems trail or climb, originating from a large underground tuber that is visible above the soil surface. Leaves are simple and 2-lobed. Forked tendrils are usually present. Inflorescence is a lateral raceme. Flowers are yellow, bisexual, heterostylous, with 5 petals. Pods are large, woody and have 1 or 2 seeds. Herostyly, or flower polymorphism, occurs in all species of Tylosema, although it is unknown in the rest of the family Leguminosae.

== Phylogeny ==
Tylosema species are in the family Leguminosae, the third largest family of flowering plants (Doyle and Luckow, 2003), in the subfamily Cercidoideae. The type species for the Tylosema genus is T. fassoglense.

The phylogeny of Tylosema is somewhat disputed. This is in part because it has not been widely collected or studied. Although previously located in the Bauhinia genus, now Tylosema has been established as its own genus and is strongly supported as monophyletic.

Wunderlin has proposed a reorganization of the tribe Cercideae wherein 12 genera are placed into two subtribes, Cercinidae and Bauhiniinae. Bauhiniinae is divided into two clades, the first is poorly resolved and includes the genera Bauhinia, Brenierea and Piliostigma. The second clade comprises the genera Tylosema, Barklya, Gigasiphon, Lysiphyllum, Phanera, and Schnella.

== Biology and use ==
In Botswana and Namibia, T. esculentum, or Morama bean, is a staple food of the Khoisan people but plants have not been established for cultivation. The beans have high protein content (30-39%) and high oil content (36-43%) and are eaten after boiling or roasting. Beans also have significant levels of calcium, iron, zinc, phosphate, magnesium, and B vitamins including folate.

Preliminary research indicates that seeds of T. esculentum have no physiological dormancy, although germination is improved by scarification. It is disputed as to whether Morama beans exhibit antiviral and antimicrobial properties.

Research shows that T. esculentum is both drought avoidant and drought tolerant, but this has not been measured in other Tylosema species.
