= Vitamin K antagonist =

Group of substances

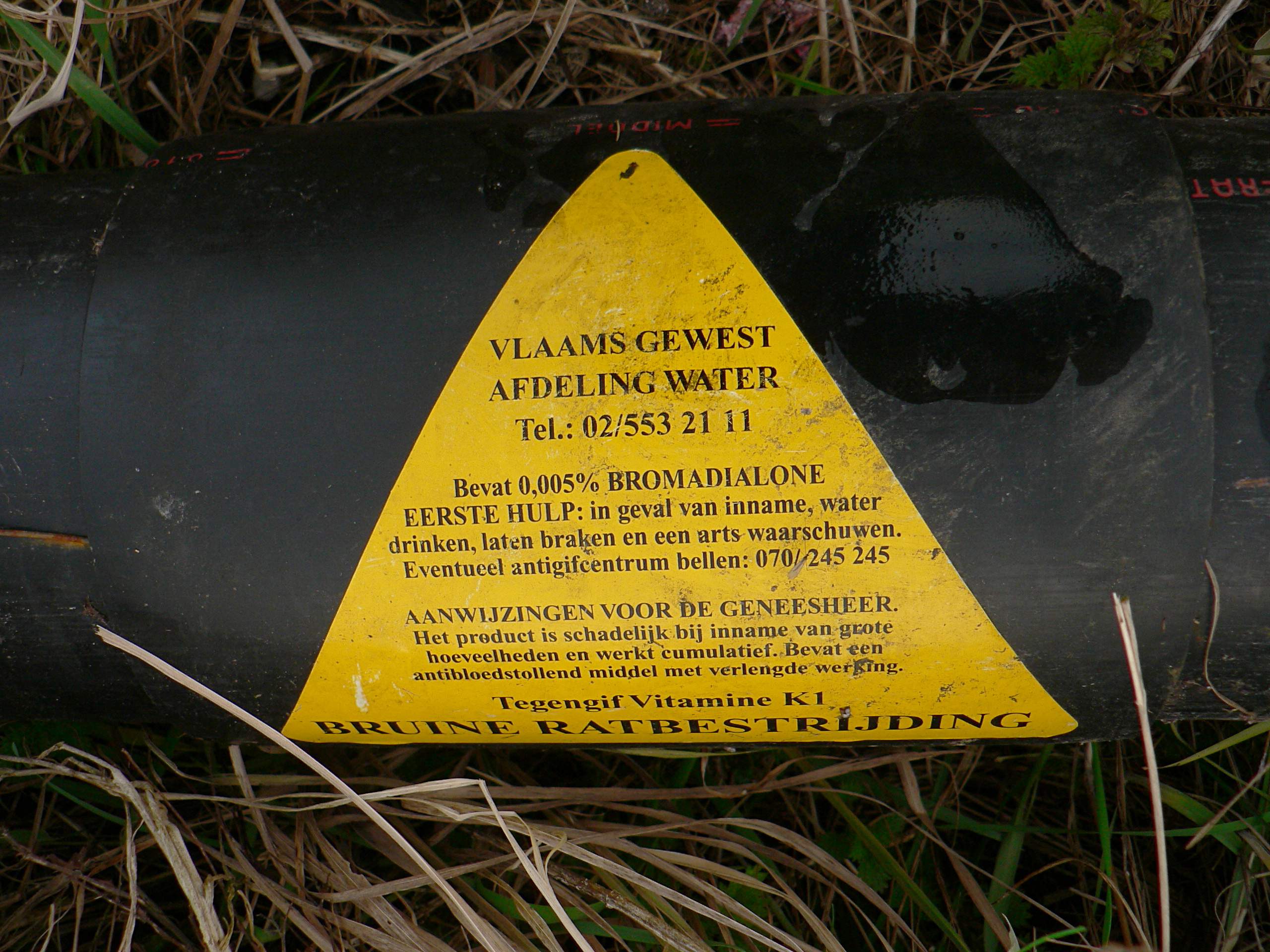
Warning label on a tube of "brown rat" poison laid on a dike of the Scheldt river in Steendorp, Belgium. The tube contains bromadiolone, a second-generation (superwarfarin) anticoagulant. The label in Dutch states, in part: Contains an anticoagulant with prolonged activity. Antidote Vitamin K1.

Vitamin K_{2} (menaquinone). In menaquinone the side chain is composed of a varying number of isoprenoid residues.

Vitamin K antagonists (VKA) are a group of substances that reduce blood clotting by reducing the action of vitamin K. The term "vitamin K antagonist" is technically a misnomer, as the drugs do not directly antagonize the action of vitamin K in the pharmacological sense, but rather the recycling of vitamin K. Vitamin K antagonists (VKAs) have been the mainstay of anticoagulation therapy for more than 50 years.

They are used as anticoagulant medications in the prevention of thrombosis, and in pest control, as rodenticides.

== Mechanism of action ==
These drugs deplete the active form of the vitamin by inhibiting the enzyme vitamin K epoxide reductase and thus the recycling of the inactive vitamin K epoxide back to the active reduced form of vitamin K. The drugs are structurally similar to vitamin K and act as competitive inhibitors of the enzyme. The term "vitamin K antagonist" is a misnomer, as the drugs do not directly antagonise the action of vitamin K in the pharmacological sense, but rather the recycling of vitamin K.

Vitamin K is required for the proper production of certain proteins involved in the blood clotting process. For example, it is needed to carboxylate specific glutamic acid residues on prothrombin. Without these residues carboxylated, the protein will not form the appropriate conformation of thrombin, which is needed to produce the fibrin monomers that are polymerized to form clots.

The action of this class of anticoagulants may be reversed by administering vitamin K for the duration of the anticoagulant's residence in the body, and the daily dose needed for reversal is the same for all drugs in the class. However, in the case of the second generation superwarfarins intended to kill warfarin-resistant rodents, the time of vitamin K administration may need to be prolonged to months, in order to combat the long residence time of the poison.

The vitamin K antagonists can cause birth defects (teratogens).

Vitamin K is used to produce coagulation factors. VKAs interfere with the recycling of Vitamin K epoxide into Vitamin K (step 4 to 1).

== Coumarins (4-hydroxycoumarins) ==
Coumarins (more accurately 4-hydroxycoumarins) are the most commonly used VKAs.

In medicine, the most commonly used VKA is warfarin. Warfarin was initially used as a rodenticide, but made the transition to pharmaceutical. Eventually some rodents developed resistance to it. The "second generation" VKAs for dedicated use as rodenticides are sometimes called superwarfarins. These VKAs are enhanced to kill warfarin-resistant rodents. The enhancement to the molecule takes the form of a larger lipophilic group to enhance the fat solubility of the poison and greatly increase the time it acts within the animal's body. However, as described above, the superwarfarins do not inhibit vitamin K and their effect is easily inhibited by vitamin K. Nevertheless, oral vitamin K may need to be given for times that may exceed a month (cases have been described needing as much as nine months vitamin K supplementation), in order to counter the effect of second-generation VKAs that have very long residence times in the fat of animals and humans.

For a more complete list of coumarins used as pharmaceuticals and rodenticides, see the main article on 4-hydroxycoumarins.

Warfarin (Coumadin)

Coumatetralyl

Phenprocoumon

Acenocoumarol

Dicoumarol

Tioclomarol

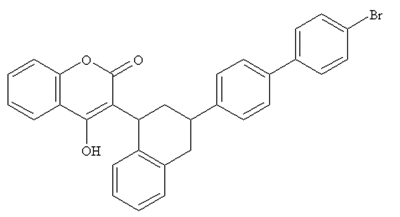
Brodifacoum

== Indandiones ==
Another group of VKAs are 1,3-indandione derivatives. Pindone, chlorophacinone, and diphacinone are used as rodenticides. They are categorised as "first-generation" anticoagulants, and have similar effects as warfarin. They have been largely superseded by second-generation anticoagulants because warfarin-resistant rodents have become more common.

Anisindione, fluindione, and phenindione are oral anticoagulant medicines with actions similar to warfarin. However, the indandiones are generally more toxic than warfarin, with hypersensitivity reactions involving many organs and sometimes resulting in death. They are therefore now rarely used.

Pindone

Chlorophacinone

Diphacinone

Anisindione

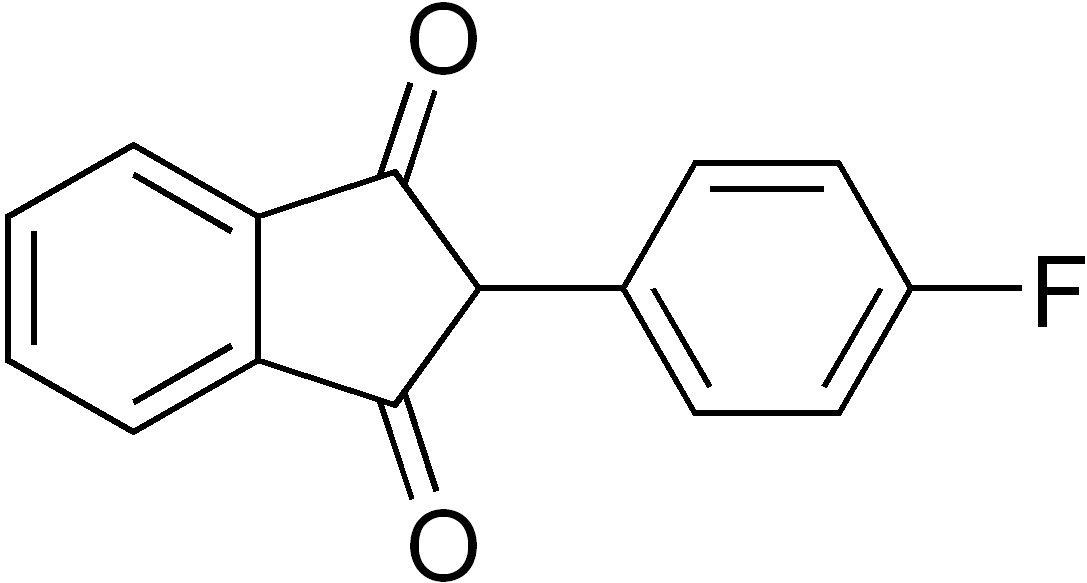
Fluindione

Phenindione

== See also ==
- Vitamin K deficiency
- Category:Vitamin K antagonists
