= Indandione =

Indandione may refer to:

- 1,2-Indandione
- 1,3-Indandione
