= Ninhydrin =

- Ninhydrin

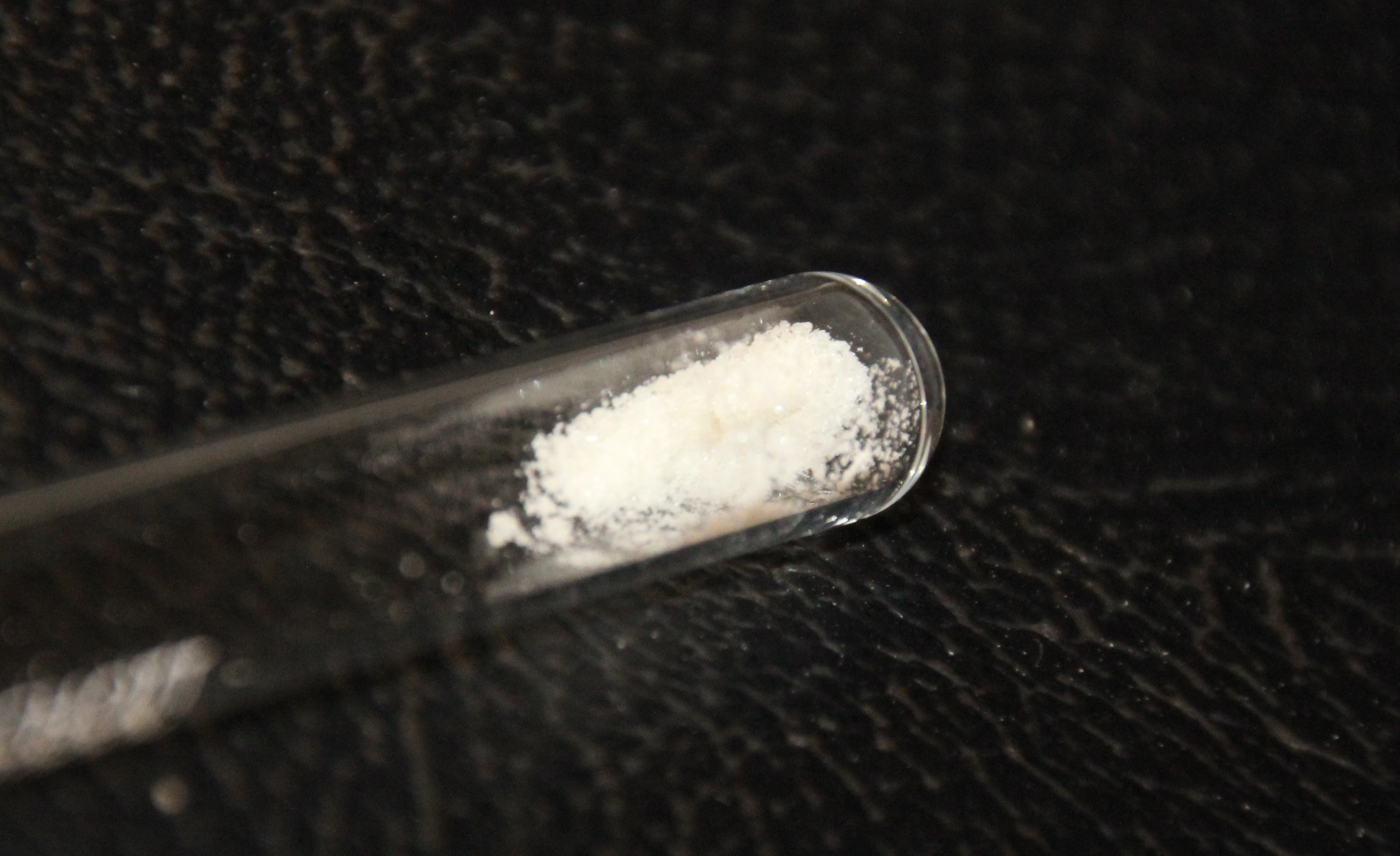

Names
- Preferred IUPAC name 2,2-Dihydroxy-1H-indene-1,3(2H)-dione
- Other names 2,2-Dihydroxyindane-1,3-dione; 1,2,3-Indantrione hydrate

Identifiers
CAS Number	485-47-2
3D model (JSmol)	Interactive image
ChEMBL	ChEMBL1221925
ChemSpider	9819
ECHA InfoCard	100.006.926
EC Number	213-340-1
PubChem CID	10236
UNII	HCL6S9K23A
CompTox Dashboard (EPA)	DTXSID7025716
- InChI: InChI=1S/C9H6O4/c10-7-5-3-1-2-4-6(5)8(11)9(7,12)13/h1-4,12-13H Key: FEMOMIGRRWSMCU-UHFFFAOYSA-N; InChI=1/C9H6O4/c10-7-5-3-1-2-4-6(5)8(11)9(7,12)13/h1-4,12-13H Key: FEMOMIGRRWSMCU-UHFFFAOYAM
- SMILES: O=C2c1ccccc1C(=O)C2(O)O

Properties
Chemical formula	C_{9}H_{6}O_{4}
Molar mass	178.143 g·mol^{−1}
Appearance	White solid
Density	0.862 g/cm^{3}
Melting point	250 °C (482 °F; 523 K) (decomposes)
Solubility in water	20 g L^{−1}

Hazards
- GHS labelling
Pictograms	(GHS07: Exclamation mark)
Signal word	Warning
Hazard statements	H302, H315, H319, H335
Precautionary statements	P261, P264, P270, P271, P280, P301+P312, P302+P352, P304+P340, P305+P351+P338, P312, P321, P330, P332+P313, P337+P313, P362, P403+P233, P405, P501
Safety data sheet (SDS)	External MSDS
- Except where otherwise noted, data are given for materials in their standard state (at 25 °C [77 °F], 100 kPa). verify (what is ?) Infobox references

Ninhydrin (2,2-dihydroxyindane-1,3-dione) is an organic compound with the formula C_{6}H_{4}(CO)_{2}C(OH)_{2}. It is used to detect ammonia and amines. Upon reaction with these amines, ninhydrin gets converted into deep blue or purple derivatives, which are called Ruhemann's purple. Ninhydrin is most commonly used to detect fingerprints in forensic cases, as the terminal amines of lysine residues in peptides and proteins sloughed off in fingerprints react with ninhydrin.

Ninhydrin is a white solid that is soluble in ethanol and acetone. Ninhydrin can be considered as the hydrate of indane-1,2,3-trione.

== History ==
Ninhydrin was discovered in 1910 by the German-English chemist Siegfried Ruhemann (1859–1943). In the same year, Ruhemann observed ninhydrin's reaction with amino acids. In 1954, Swedish investigators Oden and von Hofsten proposed that ninhydrin could be used to develop latent fingerprints.

== Uses ==
Ninhydrin can be used in Kaiser test to monitor deprotection in solid phase peptide synthesis. The chain is linked via its C-terminus to the solid support, with the N-terminus extending off it. When that nitrogen is deprotected, a ninhydrin test yields blue. Amino-acid residues are attached with their N-terminus protected, so if the next residue has been successfully coupled onto the chain, the test gives a colorless or yellow result.

Ninhydrin is also used in qualitative analysis of proteins. Most of the amino acids, except proline, are hydrolyzed and react with ninhydrin. Also, certain amino acid chains are degraded. Therefore, separate analysis is required for identifying such amino acids that either react differently or do not react with ninhydrin at all. The rest of the amino acids are then quantified colorimetrically after separation by chromatography. Oftentimes specialized amino acid analyzers using HPLC technology and post-column derivatization with ninhydrin are applied for the detection of free and protein-bound amino acids, as required throughout the EU in the feed industry.

A solution suspected of containing the ammonium ion can be tested by ninhydrin by dotting it onto a solid support (such as silica gel); treatment with ninhydrin should result in a dramatic purple color if the solution contains this species. In the analysis of a chemical reaction by thin layer chromatography (TLC), the reagent can also be used (usually 0.2% solution in either n-butanol or in ethanol). It will detect, on the TLC plate, virtually all amines, carbamates and also, after vigorous heating, amides.

Upon reaction with ninhydrin, amino acids undergo decarboxylation. The released CO_{2} originates from the carboxyl carbon of the amino acid. This reaction has been used to release the carboxyl carbons of bone collagen from ancient bones for stable isotope analysis in order to help reconstruct the palaeodiet of cave bears. Release of the carboxyl carbon (via ninhydrin) from amino acids recovered from soil that has been treated with a labeled substrate demonstrates assimilation of that substrate into microbial protein. This approach was successfully used to reveal that some ammonium oxidizing bacteria, also called nitrifying bacteria use urea as a carbon source in soil.

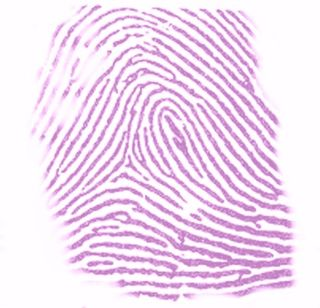
A stain obtained after a thumbprint is treated with ninhydrin.

=== Forensics ===
A ninhydrin solution is commonly used by forensic investigators in the analysis of latent fingerprints on porous surfaces such as paper. The amino acids present in the minute sweat secretions that gather on the finger's unique ridges transfer to surfaces that are touched. Exposure of the surface to ninhydrin converts the amino acids into visibly colored products and thus reveals the print. The test solutions suffer from poor long-term stability, especially if not kept cold.

To further enhance the ability of ninhydrin, a solution of 1,2-indandione and zinc chloride (IND-Zn) can be used prior to ninhydrin. This sequence leads to greater overall reaction of the amino acids, possibly by IND-Zn helping to release them from the surface for the subsequent ninhydrin reaction.

== Reactivity ==
Ninhydrin exists in equilibrium with the triketone indane-1,2,3-trione, which reacts readily with nucleophiles (including water). Whereas for most carbonyl compounds, a carbonyl form is more stable than a product of water addition (hydrate), ninhydrin forms a stable hydrate of the central carbon because of the destabilizing effect of the adjacent carbonyl groups.

To generate the ninhydrin chromophore [2-(1,3-dioxoindan-2-yl)iminoindane-1,3-dione], the amine must condense to give a Schiff base. The reaction of ninhydrin with secondary amines gives an iminium salt, which is also coloured, generally being yellow–orange.

== Effects on health ==
Ninhydrin may cause allergic, IgE-mediated rhinitis and asthma. A case has been described in which a 41 year old forensic laboratory worker working with Ninhydrin developed rhinitis and respiratory difficulty. Her specific IgE levels were found almost doubled.

== See also ==
- Hydrindantin
- Paper chromatography
