= Kentjur =

Kentjur is a common name for several flowering plants in the family Zingiberaceae native to Asia with rhizomes used as spices. Kentjur may refer to:

- Curcuma zedoaria
- Kaempferia galanga
