= C19H16O3 =

The molecular formula C_{19}H_{16}O_{3} (molar mass: 292.33 g/mol, exact mass: 292.1099 u) may refer to:

- 1,7-Bis(4-hydroxyphenyl)-1,4,6-heptatrien-3-one
- Coumatetralyl
