= Status and conservation of the golden eagle =

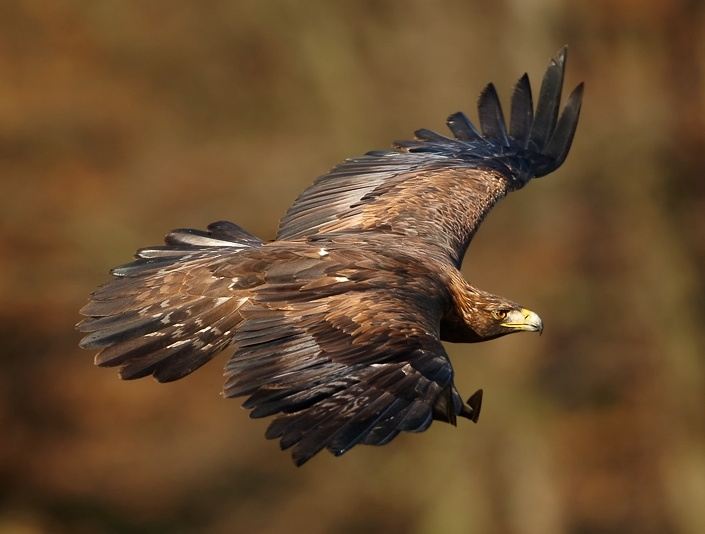
In flight in Czech Republic

At one time, the golden eagle lived in a great majority of temperate Europe, North Asia, North America, North Africa, and Japan. Although widespread and quite secure in some areas, in many parts of the range golden eagles have experienced sharp population declines and have even been extirpated from some areas. The total number of individual golden eagles from around the range is estimated to range somewhere between 170,000 and 250,000 while the estimated total number of breeding pairs ranges from 60,000 to 100,000. Few other eagle species are as numerous, though some species like tawny eagle, wedge-tailed eagle and bald eagle have total estimated populations of a similar size to the golden eagle's despite having distributions which are more restricted. The world's most populous eagle may be the African fish eagle (Haliaeetus vocifer), which has a stable total population estimated at 300,000 individuals and is found solely in Africa. On a global scale, the golden eagle is not considered threatened by the IUCN.

== Eurasia ==
In Europe, there are an estimated 6,000 to 10,000 breeding pairs. There was a great decline in Central Europe where they are now essentially restricted to the Apennine, Alps, and Carpathian Mountains. The strongholds in the continent are Spain, which holds an estimated 1,300 breeding pairs, Norway, which holds an estimated 860 to 1,040 breeding pairs and European Russia, which holds an estimated 500 to 1,000 breeding pairs. Other European countries with stable and sizable populations include Italy, with an estimated 476–541 pairs, Switzerland, with 300–310 pairs and Romania, with an estimated 85–130 pairs. The following nations are thought to have golden eagle populations that are increasing: Bulgaria with 150–170 pairs, Denmark with 3–5 pairs (has continuously bred in the country since 1998, but the species might also have bred up until the 1800s), Finland with an estimated 300–350 pairs, France with approximately 390–460 pairs, Hungary with 3–5 known pairs, Ireland with 2 current pairs and Poland with approximately 35–40 pairs. The following nations are thought to have decreasing golden eagle populations: Albania with about 50–200 pairs, Croatia with approximately 90–110 pairs, England with no known current pairs, Greece with an estimated 100–200 breeding pairs and Latvia with somewhere around 5–10 pairs. Several other European countries have a small number of golden eagles with less than 50 breeding pairs but with populations that are generally considered stable. Despite their large population there, the golden eagle was considered near threatened in Spain in a 2003 report. One of the authors of the previous study asserted that the population had increased in 2008 by perhaps 20% in Spain since the last survey in the late 1990s. In Belarus, the population has reportedly declined considerably due to trapping, poisoning and the draining and development of upland bogs. The golden eagle is considered Critically Endangered in the Czech Republic, where it was once quite common in the Beskids and Giant Mountains until logging hit the area hard around the time of World War II. All recent breeding attempts by the species in the Czech Republic are believed to have been unsuccessful.

In Britain, the last comprehensive survey of golden eagles took place in 2003, and found 442 occupied territories. A less thorough survey in 2007 showed that in addition to large numbers of territories in the Scottish Highlands and the Inner and Outer Hebrides, there were a handful of birds in southern Scotland and northern England. The population is higher today in Scotland than it was in the 19th century, due to the heavy persecution at that time by sheep farmers, gamekeepers, and collectors. There may have been as few as 190 pairs in the 1950s, though this survey may have not been complete. Between 1969 and 2003 they nested in the Lake District, Cumbria. In Ireland, where it had been extinct due to hunting since 1912, efforts are being made to re-introduce the species. In April 2007, a pair of golden eagles produced the first chick to be hatched in the Republic of Ireland in nearly a century. Forty-six birds were released into the wild in Glenveagh National Park, County Donegal, from 2001 to 2006, with at least three known female fatalities since then. It is intended to release a total of sixty birds, to ensure a viable population. The reintroduced golden eagles at the park produced a pair of fledglings for the first time in 2011. The golden eagle is classified as bird of "High Conservation Concern" in Ireland.

Fewer estimates are known from Asia and North Africa. A stronghold population is in mountainous Turkey, where the large population included an estimated 2,000–3,000 breeding pairs persist. In Japan, there is an estimated 175–260 breeding pairs, with a total population of approximately 500 individuals. One study stated that food shortages and decreases in suitable foraging habitat are assumed to be responsible for an observed decline in population size and reproductive success in Japan. In the Koreas, the golden eagle is known to be rarely observed and, in 2010, only 10 were seen in South Korea during winter birding censuses. Little is known in terms of population numbers elsewhere in Eurasia, with the IUCN estimating between 100 and 10,000 individuals each in China and in Russia, numbers that suggest the species occurs very sparsely in these massive countries. In North Africa, the main occurrence is in Morocco, which is estimated to hold 200 to 500 breeding pairs. There appear to much fewer in other North African countries, with small, scattered populations in Algeria, Tunisia and Egypt, areas where no immature-plumaged eagles were observed in 2005.

== North America ==
In North America the situation is not as dramatic. One estimate of the number of breeding pairs in the contiguous Western United States that excluded California, South Dakota, Montana and Oregon was 9,387. The state with the largest known winter count of golden eagles is Montana with 13,138, followed by Wyoming with 10,072, Colorado with 7,081 and Utah with 5,993. Wyoming had the highest estimated set of breeding pairs 3,381–4,174, followed by 1,800 in Utah, 1,200 in Nevada and California and Idaho both with around 500 pairs (notably, Montana was not included in these particular studies, although the breeding population must include well over a thousand pair there). In 6 out of 8 Canadian provinces where golden eagles breed, over 10,000 birds were observed in breeding bird surveys. In 1981, it was estimated that there were 63,242 wintering individual golden eagles in the 16 Western United States (excluding Alaska). However, there has still been a noticeable decline in some areas.

== Threats ==
Almost all threats to golden eagles are attributable, directly or indirectly, to human activities. Human-sourced threats include: habitat change, persecution, poisoning (often directed at other species) and collisions with man-made objects. The most widespread unintentional threat to golden eagles by humans is urbanization and human-population growth which have made areas historically used by eagles unsuitable both in terms of habitat and prey availability. Habitat destruction in North America had, by the late 19th century, already driven golden eagles from some regions they used to inhabit. In Southern California and the Colorado Front Range, this has been proved via long-term population and habitat surveys. In Western China, the main threats to golden eagles are land development, the use of pesticides and captures for falconry. Fires since 1980 have caused large-scale losses of shrubs and jackrabbit habitat in areas used by eagles throughout the Intermountain West of North America. Wildfires that burned more 40,000 hectares of scrublands between 1981 and 1987 in the Morley Nelson Snake River Birds of Prey National Conservation Area affected nesting populations adversely. Nesting success at burned territories in Snake River Canyon declined after major fires. Abandoned burned territories have been subsumed by neighboring pairs, resulting in a decreased number of nesting pairs.

Where disturbance is regular, breeding failure for golden eagles is significantly more frequent. This was inferred in the 1982 Scottish breeding bird survey when disturbances were heavy in the Highlands. Sheep farmers and egg-collectors are the leading cause of disturbances at the nests. Recreation, forest management and development projects such as road construction, mining or power generation are other potential sources of disturbances. When disturbed by humans at the nest, the parents frequently leave their nest for a period of up to two hours, reduced provisioning rates, endangered eggs or young to predation, as well as overheating, chilling or desiccation. Human intrusion within 750–1,500 m (2,460–4,920 ft) of nests can cause a disturbance. Nesting success was found to be reduced in Norway during years where the Easter holidays fell early, due to the volume of vacationers in the countryside in these years during the pivotal early stages of nesting. During a study in Wrangell – St. Elias National Park and Preserve of Alaska, experimenters camped within 400 m (1,300 ft) of active nests, which led to reduced food delivery and nest attendance by the parents, then at 800 m (2,600 ft), at which distance the disturbance of nesting behavior seemed to decrease considerably. The topography of the landscape and location of the nest can affect how closely the nest can be approached without disturbance. Mining and various types of energy development occur in eagle nesting and wintering habitat. The practice of surface coal mining threatens the limited nesting sites in Wyoming. In the Italian Apennines, high levels of nesting failures have been attributed directly to disturbance, due to increased tourism in remote mountain areas, construction of new roads and mining. Aggressive behavior by golden eagles due to a human presence near the nest is considered exceptional and usually will only result in minor injuries if any, as a particularly bold eagle may rarely attempt to dissuade a human trespasser. Golden eagles are somewhat sensitive to human disturbance even while not nesting. Experimental studies showed that pedestrians, which caused flushing at 105–390 m (344–1,280 ft), were more likely to cause wintering golden eagles in Colorado to flush than vehicles, at 14–190 m (46–623 ft). This study showed that golden eagles were more sensitive to human disturbance during winter than several other raptor species, including bald eagles.

The intentional killing of golden eagles has been a conservation hurdle for the species. Golden eagles are intentionally killed usually due to the fear of loss of livestock and game species. This is despite the findings of virtually every study of losses of stock to golden eagles has revealed that the actual amount of livestock killed by the eagles is negligible and financial restitution from conservation organizations should not be necessary, including those studies funded by the farming organizations or governmental programs seeking to justify the "control" of golden eagles. While illegal in most countries today, hunting, trapping and poisoning may still occur. In the United States, the golden eagle was given federally protected status in 1963. Occasionally, golden eagles may be caught in trap lines laid out to capture mammalian predators. In a study conducted in Scotland, areas were broken down into low disturbance areas (with a low human presence and limited history of persecution), moderate areas (where minor disturbances occur, mainly unintentionally from hill-walkers or rarely intentionally by egg-collectors) or severe disturbance areas (where persecution, heavy disturbance and considerable egg-collecting is believed to still occur). In low disturbance areas, about 45% of nests failed, in moderate disturbance areas about 74% failed and in severe disturbance areas 93% of nesting attempts failed. 73 out of 147 inaccessible nesting sites in this study (50%) produced fledglings, whereas more accessible nests produced fledglings in only 21 out of 68 nests (31%).

Poisoning, both intentional and unintentional, is also a threat. The usual targets of carrion-poisoning are species such as coyotes, red fox and gray wolves, which are considered pests that threaten livestock. However, golden eagles are occasionally targeted as well for the same reasons. The main cause of mortality for golden eagles in Britain has been poisoning, 51 eagles have been verified to be killed by poisoning from 1980 to 2008 but the actual number killed is probably higher. A disproportionate amount of golden eagle poisonings in Scotland from 1981 to 2000 were linked to grouse moors (where grouse are kept for the pleasure of shooting) and were probably caused by gamekeepers deliberately poisoning eagles and foxes to keep their stock of grouse high. It is estimated that the adult survival rate is reduced by 3% to 5% in Scotland by intentional poisonings. In the 1980s, California ground squirrels, considered agricultural pests, were poisoned by the anticoagulant rodenticide, Chlorophacinone. In turn, the poisonings caused golden eagles, as one of the major natural predators of California ground squirrels, to die in turn. At least 10 individuals died in 1971 from eating Thallium(I) sulfate–laced pronghorn set out by sheep ranchers in Wyoming; despite public outcries, poisoning by sheep ranchers continued into the 1980s. In the 20th century, organochloride and heavy metal poisonings were also commonplace, but these have declined due to tighter regulations on pollution. In southern Idaho, 10 out of 17 golden eagles examined were found to have had exposure to lead. Golden eagles did not prove as susceptible to poisoning from the pesticide DDT as other large raptors, probably because of their diet of mammals. Eggs from golden eagle nests that were collected after 1946 in North America had shell thicknesses similar to (less than a 10% difference) those collected in earlier years. However, in Scotland egg shell thickness did decrease by around 10% from 1951 to 1965. A dead golden eagle collected on the Isle of Lewis had the highest concentration of organochlorine known from a modern bird in Scotland. The higher effects of organochlorines in Scotland may be due to the fact that birds there consume a relatively high quantity of seabirds, as opposed to North America, where this practice is rare.

Death by collisions with man-made structures and objects can be a serious local issue. Electrocution or collision with power lines has become an increasingly significant cause of mortality since the early 20th century. Juveniles birds are more susceptible than adults, being generally less cautious and physically adept. It is estimated that up to 70 golden eagles may be killed locally by wind turbines each year in west-central California, almost all of them being juveniles as opposed to adults which tend to remain on their home ranges that largely occur outside of the wind farm area. Collisions with automobiles rarely claim golden eagle lives, though instances of this can increase in desolate areas during winter, when road-side prey or carrion may attract the eagles.

In a few cases, mankind has accidentally benefited golden eagles by logging previously heavily wooded areas. This has been recorded in the 1800s and 1900s in the Appalachian Mountains of the Eastern United States, where reforestation has now made the habitat unsuitable for nesting eagles, and in Washington state, which still holds breeding eagles in desolate areas that have been logged. Afforestation, the commercial planting of non-native woodland, is a serious issue in Scotland, with the largest amount of it occurring in southwestern Scotland, especially in Argyll. During afforestation, the land is plowed and over 2,500 seedlings are planted per hectare, mainly with exotic conifers including Sitka spruce (Picea sitchensis) and lodgepole pine (Pinus contorta). The woodland canopy closes and ground vegetation dies, making these dark and gloomy places until harvesting in 40 to 50 years. More than 50% of land in Scotland at an elevation of 200–600 m (660–1,970 ft) has been planted as such. Afforestation requires removal of sheep and the fencing out or shooting deer, both important sources of carrion for golden eagles. Foraging areas of golden eagles have been confirmed to not include afforested areas.

== Conservation ==
The golden eagle is not threatened at the species level but efforts need to be taken to prevent extinctions from many northern countries. The primary efforts undertaken to conserve the species have been, in order of prevalence from highest to lowest: conservation education and awareness, policy protection, directed land management, legislation and law enforcement and the provision of indentures. In Scotland, only 3 out of 16 regions in Scotland occupied by golden eagles since 1982 have been deemed favorable for conservation status, based upon the extent of local persecution, prey abundance and habitat change. The United Kingdom has put in place deterrent legislation to prevent behavior around the nest with the potential to cause harm and acts of willful harm to white-tailed eagles and some have advocated using the same policies for golden eagles. Education in this region mainly is undertaken by the Royal Society for Protection of Birds (RSPB). To curb the destructive practice of afforestation, some locals have switched to planting native Caledonian pine forests instead, likely resulting in much less harm to the native fauna possibly including golden eagles. While conservation efforts in Scotland have previously included the setting aside Sites of Special Scientific Interest (SSSIs), these are usually too small to benefit golden eagles. More recently, the United Kingdom government has instead taken from governmental policies enacted in Continental Europe the idea of Special Protection Areas (SPAs), which offers strong legal protection of single species. Potentially more than 7,000 km^{2} (2,700 sq mi) may be set aside in Scotland as SPA for golden eagles. Some education of mountain-climbers in country holding breeding golden eagles has been undertaken by the Mountaineering Council of Scotland. Within the United States, the golden eagle is legally protected by the Bald and Golden Eagle Protection Act. In the United States, many studies of the effects of industrialization and development have been undertaken by the very companies attempting to develop near areas holding golden eagles, in order to understand and hopefully minimize harmful effects. For example, Swan Falls electric power-plant in southern Idaho has funded research into the effects of reconstruction activities on breeding raptors (including the golden eagles), the Arch Mineral Corporation has funded studies attempting to test and successfully relocate golden eagle nests and KENETECH Windpower and the National Renewable Energy Laboratory have funded research into the effects of turbine-based wind energy on golden eagles. In the 1970s in the United States, bounds were made to reduce the number of golden eagles to die from electrocution and wire-collisions. The primary change has been to raise the central insulator more than 1 m (3.3 ft) above the cross-arm and to position the ground-wire at a lower height on the pole, both likely to reduce the probability of golden eagles striking the wires with their wings. Also, the power company may place an insulating tube from 1 to 2 m (3.3 to 6.6 ft) on either side of the pole attachment or, especially if the previous modifications are not feasible, install raised perches at the top of the power pole. In Spain, the issue of electrocutions is more intractable because all pylons were made out of metal, which makes them much more dangerous to wildlife flying into them.

== Effects on conservation-dependent species ==
On the conservation front, the golden eagle is unintentionally contributing to the conservation crisis of another animal, the island fox, a small insular relative of the gray fox found only in the Channel Islands of California. The island fox had evolved without major natural predators but the large breeding population of golden eagles in California is feeding partially on the foxes, whose already declining population cannot support sustained predation.

Also in North America, attempts to reintroduce endangered whooping cranes by mixing them with flocks of sandhill cranes have been largely unsuccessful in part due to natural predators picking off the unnaturally unwary birds. Although the chief predator has been bobcats, golden eagles are one of the other predators that are habitually killing the birds.

The golden eagle may be a competitor and, rarely, a predator of the recently reintroduced California condors in central Arizona and southern California, but the pressure exerted by the eagles on condors are seemingly minor, especially in contrast to manmade conservation issues for the species such as lead poisoning from bullets left in hunter-killed ungulate carcasses.

In Scotland, the common hen harrier has been the subject of much unfavorable attention due to the fact that it is a habitual predator of the chicks of red grouse, a subspecies considered to be near threatened in the nation. One of the methods to control harrier numbers has been proposed is to encourage a population increase of golden eagles, which may also hunt grouse but are unlikely to cull young grouse and tend to outcompete and sometimes hunt the harriers themselves.
