= Hydrindantin =

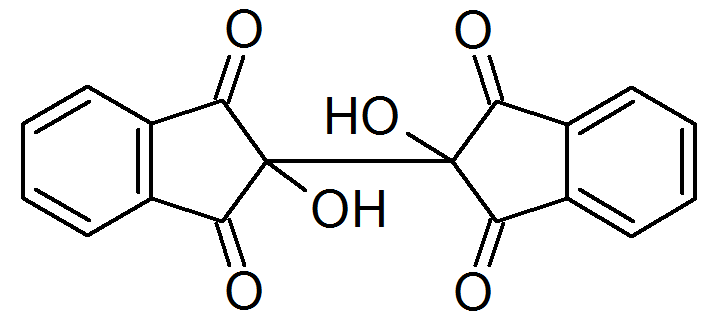

Names
- Preferred IUPAC name 2,2′-Dihydroxy-1H,1′H-[2,2′-biindene]-1,1′,3,3′(2H,2′H)-tetrone
- Other names Hydrindantin

Identifiers
CAS Number	5103-42-4
3D model (JSmol)	Interactive image
ChemSpider	19920
ECHA InfoCard	100.023.476
PubChem CID	21183
UNII	P469P1DDC0
CompTox Dashboard (EPA)	DTXSID8063701
- InChI: InChI=1S/C18H10O6/c19-13-9-5-1-2-6-10(9)14(20)17(13,23)18(24)15(21)11-7-3-4-8-12(11)16(18)22/h1-8,23-24H Key: LWFPYLZOVOCBPZ-UHFFFAOYSA-N; InChI=1/C18H10O6/c19-13-9-5-1-2-6-10(9)14(20)17(13,23)18(24)15(21)11-7-3-4-8-12(11)16(18)22/h1-8,23-24H Key: LWFPYLZOVOCBPZ-UHFFFAOYAY
- SMILES: O=C2c1ccccc1C(=O)C2(O)C4(O)C(=O)c3ccccc3C4=O

Properties
Chemical formula	C_{18}H_{10}O_{6}
Molar mass	322.268 g/mol
Density	4.44 g/cm^{3}
Melting point	decomposes at 250 °C
- Except where otherwise noted, data are given for materials in their standard state (at 25 °C [77 °F], 100 kPa). verify (what is ?) Infobox references

Hydrindantin is an organic chemical thought to be involved with the ninhydrin test for amines.
