= Coumatetralyl =

- Chemical structure of coumatetralyl

Names
- IUPAC name (RS)-2-Hydroxy-3-(1,2,3,4-tetrahydronaphthalen-1-yl)-4H-chromen-4-one

Identifiers
CAS Number	5836-29-3
3D model (JSmol)	Interactive image
ChemSpider	10468736
ECHA InfoCard	100.024.931
KEGG	C16806
PubChem CID	54678504
UNII	NWK4HW86A8
CompTox Dashboard (EPA)	DTXSID8041799
- InChI: InChI=1S/C19H16O3/c20-18-15-9-3-4-11-16(15)22-19(21)17(18)14-10-5-7-12-6-1-2-8-13(12)14/h1-4,6,8-9,11,14,20H,5,7,10H2 Key: ULSLJYXHZDTLQK-UHFFFAOYSA-N; InChI=1/C19H16O3/c20-18-15-9-3-4-11-16(15)22-19(21)17(18)14-10-5-7-12-6-1-2-8-13(12)14/h1-4,6,8-9,11,14,20H,5,7,10H2 Key: ULSLJYXHZDTLQK-UHFFFAOYAA
- SMILES: OC=1c4ccccc4OC(=O)C=1C3CCCc2ccccc23

Properties
Chemical formula	C_{19}H_{16}O_{3}
Molar mass	292.334 g·mol^{−1}

Hazards
- GHS labelling
Pictograms	(GHS06: Toxic) (GHS08: Health hazard) (GHS09: Environmental hazard)
Signal word	Danger
Hazard statements	H300, H311, H330, H360D, H372, H410
Precautionary statements	P201, P202, P260, P264, P270, P271, P273, P280, P281, P284, P301+P310, P302+P352, P304+P340, P308+P313, P310, P312, P314, P320, P321, P330, P361, P363, P391, P403+P233, P405, P501
- Except where otherwise noted, data are given for materials in their standard state (at 25 °C [77 °F], 100 kPa). verify (what is ?) Infobox references

Coumatetralyl is an anticoagulant of the 4-hydroxycoumarin vitamin K antagonist type used as a rodenticide.

== Common applications ==
Coumatetralyl is commonly used with grains and other cereals as a rodent poison in conjunction with a tracking powder to monitor feeding activity in a particular area. Tracking powder also clings to fur, which allows more poison to be ingested from grooming. Concentrations of the chemical are usually 500 mg per 1 kg of bait.

Rat poison grains

== Toxicity to humans ==
Symptoms of overexposure relate to failure of the blood clotting mechanism and include bleeding gums and failure of blood clotting after skin wounds. After one exposure the toxicity of coumatetralyl is relatively low; however, if overexposure continues for several days the product becomes more toxic. The product must therefore be constantly present in the bloodstream for more than one to two days in order to be highly toxic. A single exposure, even though relatively large, may not produce toxic symptoms as the compound is quite rapidly metabolized.

Chronic animal studies show no evidence of carcinogenic or teratogenic effects.

== Treatment ==
Vitamin K_{1} (phylloquinone) is antidotal.

== See also ==
- C_{19}H_{16}O_{3}
