= Anisindione =

Chemical compound

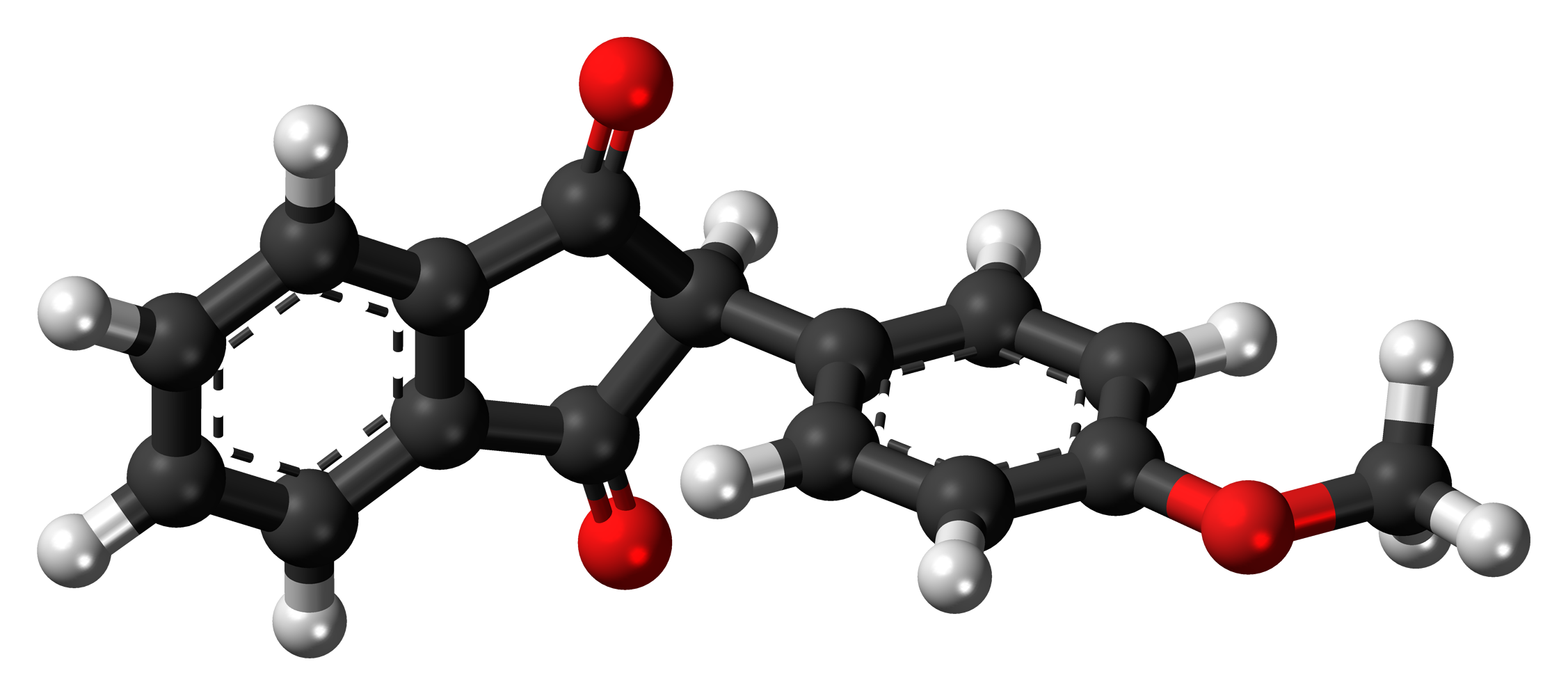

Clinical data
- AHFS/Drugs.com: Micromedex Detailed Consumer Information
- Routes of administration: Oral
- ATC code: none

Identifiers
- IUPAC name: 2-(4-methoxyphenyl)indene-1,3-dione
- CAS Number: 117-37-3
- PubChem CID: 2197
- IUPHAR/BPS: 6960
- DrugBank: DB01125
- ChemSpider: 2112
- UNII: S747T1ERAJ
- KEGG: D07457
- ChEBI: CHEBI:133809
- ChEMBL: ChEMBL712
- CompTox Dashboard (EPA): DTXSID3022611
- ECHA InfoCard: 100.003.806

Chemical and physical data
- Formula: C_{16}H_{12}O_{3}
- Molar mass: 252.269 g·mol^{−1}
- 3D model (JSmol): Interactive image
- SMILES: O=C2c1ccccc1C(=O)C2c3ccc(OC)cc3
- InChI: InChI=1S/C16H12O3/c1-19-11-8-6-10(7-9-11)14-15(17)12-4-2-3-5-13(12)16(14)18/h2-9,14H,1H3; Key:XRCFXMGQEVUZFC-UHFFFAOYSA-N

Anisindione (brand name Miradon) is a synthetic anticoagulant and an 1,3-indandione derivative. It prevents the formation of active procoagulation factors II, VII, IX, and X, as well as the anticoagulant proteins C and S, in the liver by inhibiting the vitamin K–mediated gamma-carboxylation of precursor proteins.
