= Indane-1,2,3-trione =

Names
- IUPAC name Indane-1,2,3-trione
- Other names Indanetrione

Identifiers
CAS Number	938-24-9
3D model (JSmol)	Interactive image
ChemSpider	63492
EC Number	213-340-1
PubChem CID	70309
CompTox Dashboard (EPA)	DTXSID40239655
- InChI: InChI=1S/C9H4O3/c10-7-5-3-1-2-4-6(5)8(11)9(7)12/h1-4H Key: WVZWEMOFSIEEMU-UHFFFAOYSA-N
- SMILES: O=C2c1ccccc1C(=O)C2=O

Properties
Chemical formula	C_{9}H_{4}O_{3}
Molar mass	160.128 g·mol^{−1}
Appearance	raspberry-red crystals
Density	1.482 g/cm^{3}
Boiling point	338.4 °C (641.1 °F; 611.5 K)
Solubility in water	Reacts with water yielding ninhydrin; soluble in hot o-dichlorobenzene; slightly soluble in dichloromethane forming green solutions.

Hazards
- GHS labelling
Pictograms	(GHS07: Exclamation mark)
Signal word	Warning
Hazard statements	H302, H315, H319, H335
Precautionary statements	P261, P264, P270, P271, P280, P301+P312, P302+P352, P304+P340, P305+P351+P338, P312, P321, P330, P332+P313, P337+P313, P362, P403+P233, P405, P501
- Except where otherwise noted, data are given for materials in their standard state (at 25 °C [77 °F], 100 kPa). Infobox references

Indane-1,2,3-trione is the organic compound with the formula C_{6}H_{4}(CO)_{3}. The compound is the dehydrated derivative of C_{6}H_{4}(CO)_{2}C(OH)_{2}, known as ninhydrin, which is used to reveal fingerprints.

Indane-1,2,3-trione, which reacts readily with nucleophiles (including water). Whereas for most carbonyl compounds, a carbonyl form is more stable than a product of water addition (hydrate), ninhydrin forms a stable hydrate of the central carbon because of the destabilizing effect of the adjacent carbonyl groups.

To generate the ninhydrin chromophore (2-(1,3-dioxoindan-2-yl)iminoindane-1,3-dione), the amine must condense to give a Schiff base. The reaction of ninhydrin with secondary amines gives an iminium salt, which is also coloured, generally being yellow–orange.
