= Bindone =

Names
- Preferred IUPAC name [1,2′-Biindenylidene]-1′,3,3′(2H)-trione

Identifiers
CAS Number	1707-95-5
3D model (JSmol)	Interactive image
ChemSpider	14812
ECHA InfoCard	100.015.415
EC Number	216-956-9
PubChem CID	15569
UNII	INB7800050
CompTox Dashboard (EPA)	DTXSID00168932
- InChI: InChI=1S/C18H10O3/c19-15-9-14(10-5-1-2-6-11(10)15)16-17(20)12-7-3-4-8-13(12)18(16)21/h1-8H,9H2 Key: YMFDOLAAUHRURP-UHFFFAOYSA-N
- SMILES: C1C(=C2C(=O)C3=CC=CC=C3C2=O)C4=CC=CC=C4C1=O

Properties
Chemical formula	C_{18}H_{10}O_{3}
Molar mass	274.275 g·mol^{−1}
Appearance	yellow solid
Density	1.444 g/cm^{3}
Melting point	208–211 °C (406–412 °F; 481–484 K)
- Except where otherwise noted, data are given for materials in their standard state (at 25 °C [77 °F], 100 kPa). Infobox references

Bindone is an organic compound with the formula C_{6}H_{4}COCH_{2}C=C(CO)_{2}C_{6}H_{4}. A yellowish solid, it is classified as an aromatic triketone.

== Reactions ==
Bindone has been used for the detection of primary amines. It turns violet in their presence. Aromatic amines turn this reagent blue.

== Preparation ==
Bindone can be prepared by the condensation of two equivalents of 1,3-indandione. When the condensation is conducted in a solution of pyridine, triindone and other products are also observed.

Bindone formation from two molecules of 1,3-indandione
