= Fluindione =

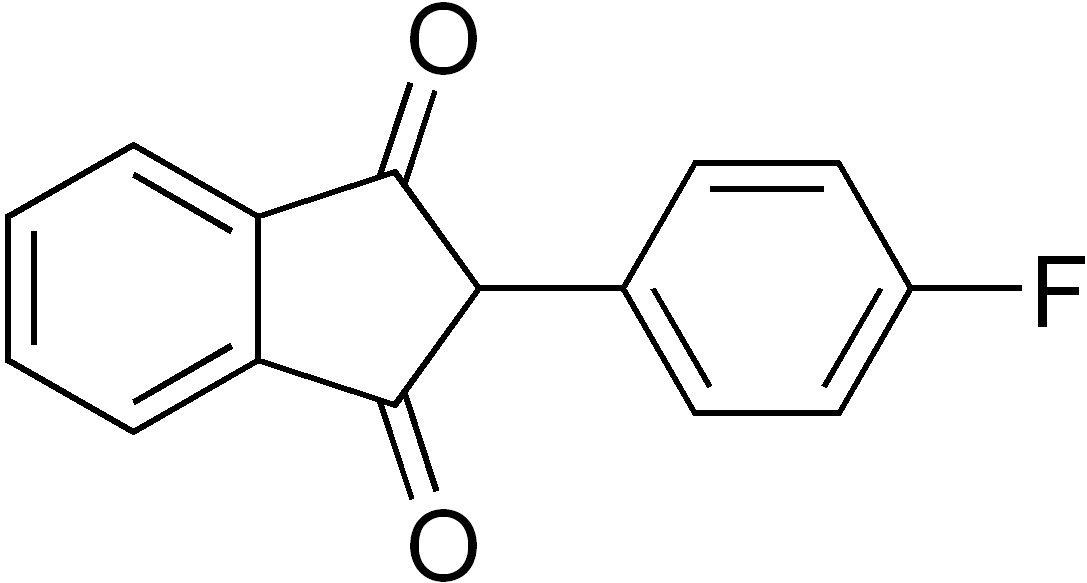

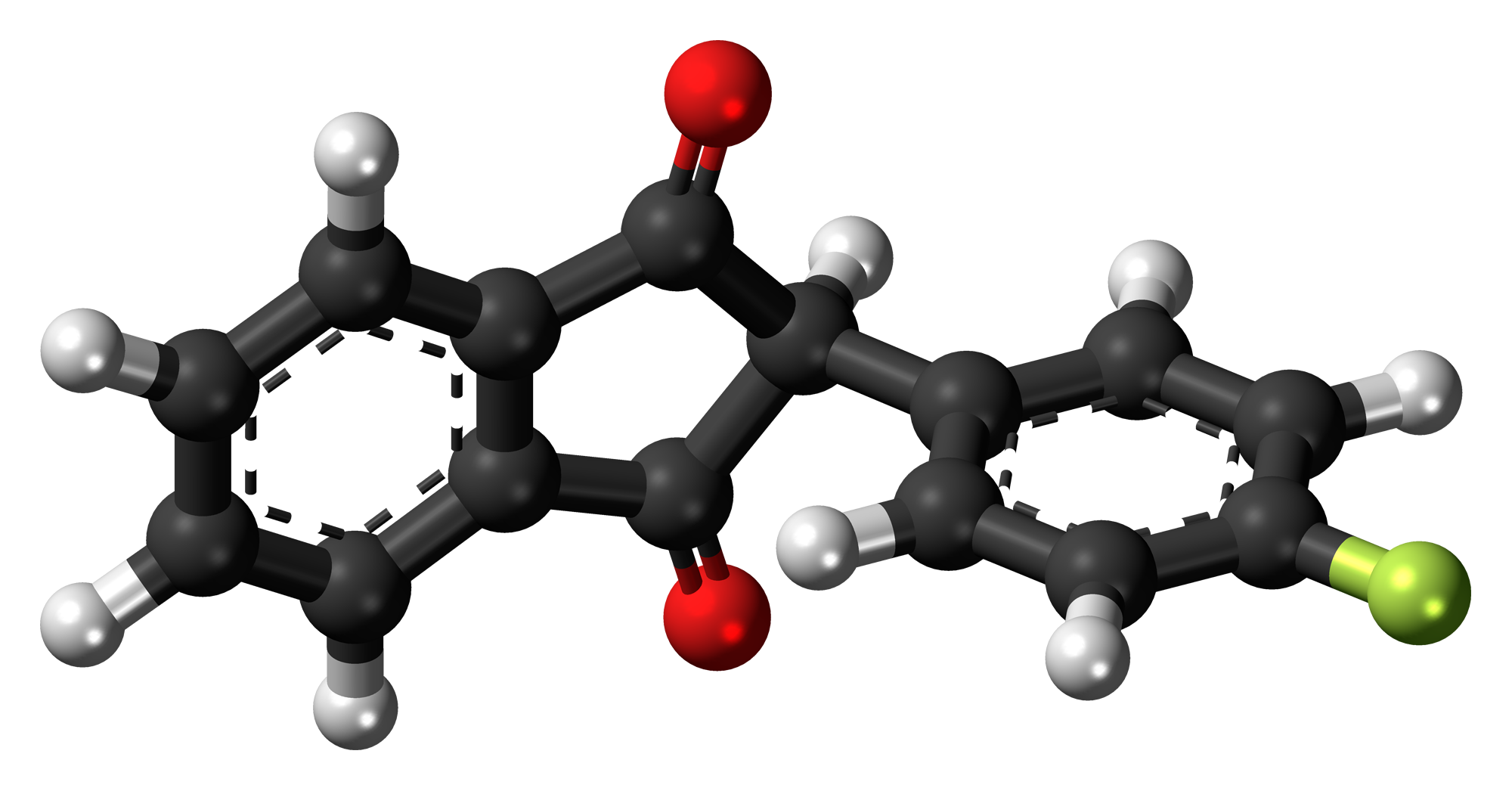

Names
- Preferred IUPAC name 2-(4-Fluorophenyl)-1H-indene-1,3(2H)-dione

Identifiers
CAS Number	957-56-2
3D model (JSmol)	Interactive image
ChemSpider	62167
ECHA InfoCard	100.012.258
EC Number	213-484-5
KEGG	D07969
MeSH	C017673
PubChem CID	68942
UNII	EQ35YMS20Q
CompTox Dashboard (EPA)	DTXSID1046211
- InChI: InChI=1S/C15H9FO2/c16-10-7-5-9(6-8-10)13-14(17)11-3-1-2-4-12(11)15(13)18/h1-8,13H Key: NASXCEITKQITLD-UHFFFAOYSA-N; InChI=1/C15H9FO2/c16-10-7-5-9(6-8-10)13-14(17)11-3-1-2-4-12(11)15(13)18/h1-8,13H Key: NASXCEITKQITLD-UHFFFAOYAN
- SMILES: C1=CC=C2C(=C1)C(=O)C(C2=O)C3=CC=C(C=C3)F

Properties
Chemical formula	C_{15}H_{9}FO_{2}
Molar mass	240.233 g·mol^{−1}

Pharmacology
ATC code	B01AA12 (WHO)
- Except where otherwise noted, data are given for materials in their standard state (at 25 °C [77 °F], 100 kPa). verify (what is ?) Infobox references

Fluindione is a vitamin K antagonist It is used as an anticoagulant.
