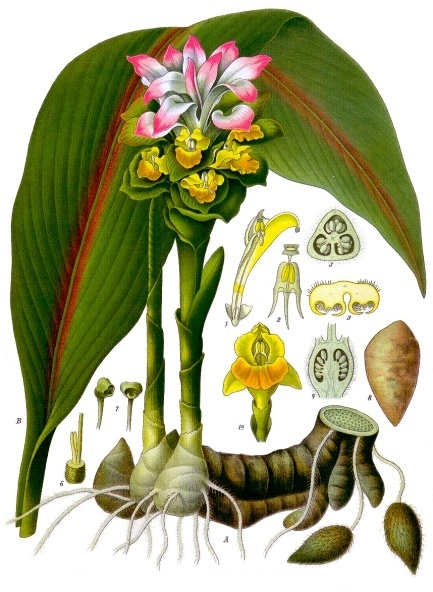

Conservation status
- Data Deficient (IUCN 3.1)

Scientific classification
- Kingdom: Plantae
- Clade: Tracheophytes
- Clade: Angiosperms
- Clade: Monocots
- Clade: Commelinids
- Order: Zingiberales
- Family: Zingiberaceae
- Genus: Curcuma
- Species: C. zedoaria

Binomial name
- Curcuma zedoaria (Christm.) Roscoe

Synonyms
- Amomum latifolium Lam.; Amomum latifolium Salisb.; Amomum zedoaria Christm.; Costus luteus Blanco; Curcuma malabarica Velay., Amalraj & Mural.; Curcuma pallida Lour.; Curcuma raktakanta Mangaly & M.Sabu; Curcuma speciosa Link; Erndlia zerumbet Giseke; Roscoea lutea (Blanco) Hassk.; Roscoea nigrociliata Hassk.

= Curcuma zedoaria =

Zedoary

Species of flowering plant

Curcuma zedoaria (zedoary /ˈzɛdoʊˌɛri/, white turmeric, or temu putih) is a perennial herb and member of the genus Curcuma, family Zingiberaceae. The plant is native to South Asia and Southeast Asia but is now naturalized in other places including the US state of Florida. Zedoary was one of the ancient food plants of the Austronesian peoples. They were spread during prehistoric times to the Pacific Islands and Madagascar during the Austronesian expansion (c. 3000 BCE). Its use as a spice in the West today is extremely rare, having been replaced by ginger, and to a lesser extent, yellow turmeric.

== Etymology ==
The name zedoary derives from Persian via Arabic and Latin.

== Characteristics ==
Zedoary grows in tropical and subtropical wet forest regions. The fragrant plant bears yellow flowers with red and green bracts and the underground stem section, a rhizome, is large and tuberous with numerous branches. The leaf shoots of the zedoary are large and can reach 1 meter (3 feet) in height.

== Uses ==
=== Food ===
The edible rhizome of zedoary has a white interior and a fragrance reminiscent of mango. However, its flavour is more similar to ginger, except with a very bitter aftertaste. In Indonesia, it is ground to a powder and added to make white curry pastes, whereas in India, it tends to be used fresh or in pickling. In Thai cuisine it is used raw and cut in thin strips in certain Thai salads. It can also be served cut into thin slices together with other herbs and vegetables with certain types of nam phrik (Thai chilli pastes). It is also used in India to flavour dals and chutneys.

=== Houseplant ===
The showy C. zedoaria is occasionally used as a houseplant.

=== In traditional medicine ===
The plant is used traditionally to treat inflammation, pain, and a variety of skin ailments including wounds, as well as menstrual irregularities and ulcers.

=== Others ===
The essential oil produced from the dried rhizomes of Curcuma zedoaria is used in perfumery and soap fabrication, as well as an ingredient in bitter tonics. The curcuminoid 1,7-bis(4-hydroxyphenyl)-1,4,6-heptatrien-3-one, and the sesquiterpenes procurcumenol and epiprocurcumenol can be found in C. zedoaria.

== See also ==
- Domesticated plants and animals of Austronesia
