= 1,2-Indandione =

Names
- Preferred IUPAC name 1H-Indene-1,2(3H)-dione
- Other names: Indan-1,2-dione; 3H-Indene-1,2-dione

Identifiers
CAS Number	16214-27-0
3D model (JSmol)	Interactive image
ChEMBL	ChEMBL235288
ChemSpider	109958
ECHA InfoCard	100.153.649
EC Number	625-123-2
PubChem CID	123358
UNII	7LZB7QNE77
CompTox Dashboard (EPA)	DTXSID50167314
- InChI: InChI=1S/C9H6O2/c10-8-5-6-3-1-2-4-7(6)9(8)11/h1-4H,5H2 Key: WFFZGYRTVIPBFN-UHFFFAOYSA-N
- SMILES: C1C2=CC=CC=C2C(=O)C1=O

Properties
Chemical formula	C_{9}H_{6}O_{2}
Molar mass	146.145 g·mol^{−1}
Melting point	117–124 °C (243–255 °F; 390–397 K)
Boiling point	273.8 °C (524.8 °F; 547.0 K)
log P	0.32

Hazards
- GHS labelling
Pictograms	(GHS05: Corrosive) (GHS07: Exclamation mark)
Signal word	Danger
Hazard statements	H302, H315, H317, H318, H335
Precautionary statements	P261, P264, P270, P271, P272, P280, P301+P312, P302+P352, P304+P340, P305+P351+P338, P310, P312, P321, P330, P332+P313, P333+P313, P362, P363, P403+P233, P405, P501
- Except where otherwise noted, data are given for materials in their standard state (at 25 °C [77 °F], 100 kPa). Infobox references

1,2-Indandione is an organic compound with the molecular formula C_{6}H_{4}(CO)_{2}CH_{2}. A yellow solid, it is classified as a vicinal diketone on an indane framework.

1,2-Indandione is used in the first stage of forensic identification of latent fingerprints. It is particularly useful for paper, and for items printed with thermal inks such as receipts. Amino acids left behind by the human hand may be developed into fingerprints by the use of it; the results, photographed with a special filter under a strong yellow-green fluorescent or green laser. It is usually the first method employed in a sequential analysis aimed at the production of evidence of a grade suitable for use in the courtroom.

1,2-Indanedione is prepared by oxidation of 1-indanone with selenium dioxide.

== See also ==
- 1,3-Indandione
