= Diphenadione =

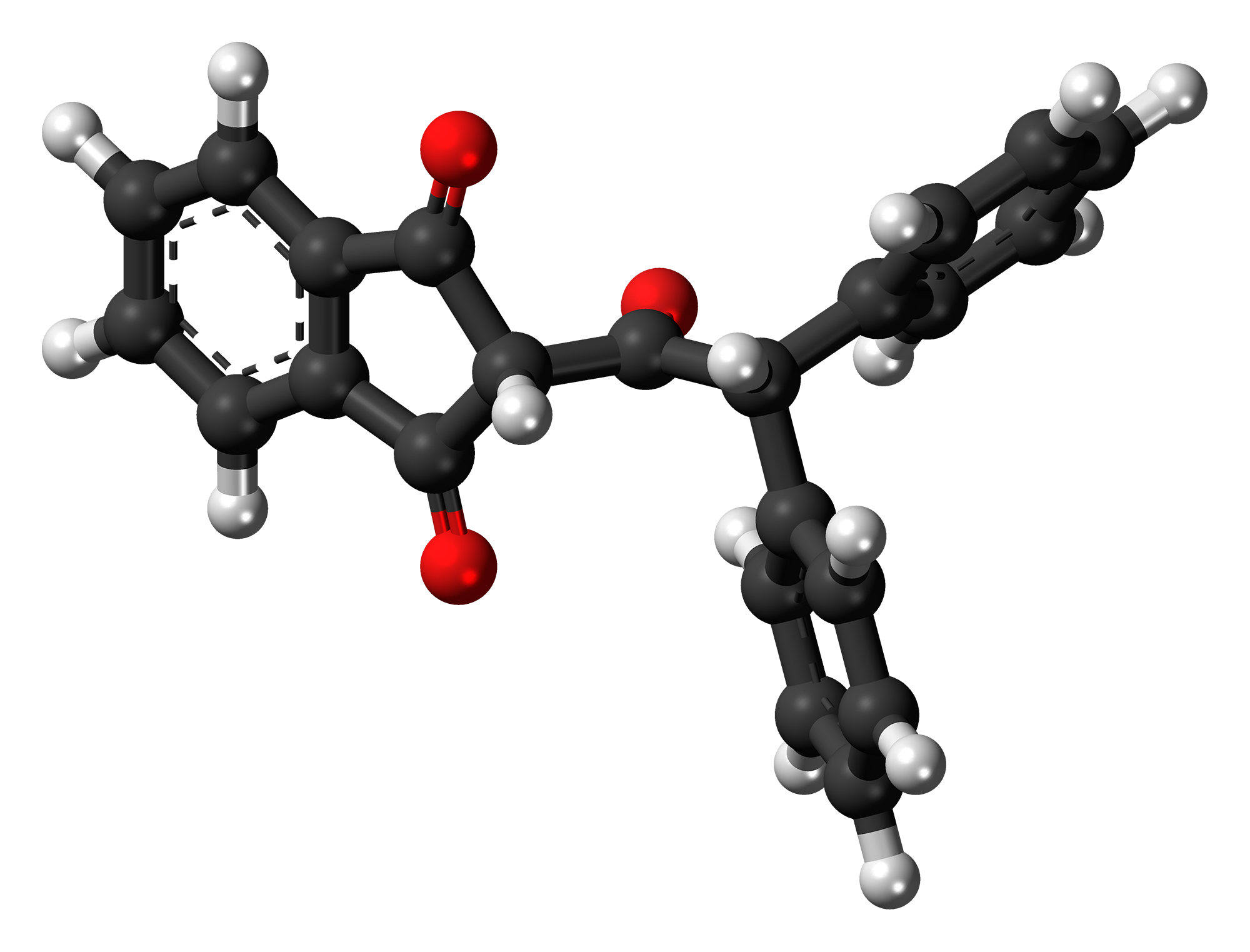

Names
- Preferred IUPAC name 2-(Diphenylacetyl)-1H-indene-1,3(2H)-dione
- Other names Diphacinone; Diphenandione, Difenacin, Ratindan

Identifiers
CAS Number	82-66-6
3D model (JSmol)	Interactive image
ChEMBL	ChEMBL1413199
ChemSpider	6463
ECHA InfoCard	100.001.304
KEGG	D07136
PubChem CID	6719
UNII	54CA01C6JX
CompTox Dashboard (EPA)	DTXSID4032378
- InChI: InChI=1S/C23H16O3/c24-21-17-13-7-8-14-18(17)22(25)20(21)23(26)19(15-9-3-1-4-10-15)16-11-5-2-6-12-16/h1-14,19-20H Key: JYGLAHSAISAEAL-UHFFFAOYSA-N; InChI=1/C23H16O3/c24-21-17-13-7-8-14-18(17)22(25)20(21)23(26)19(15-9-3-1-4-10-15)16-11-5-2-6-12-16/h1-14,19-20H Key: JYGLAHSAISAEAL-UHFFFAOYAR
- SMILES: O=C2c1ccccc1C(=O)C2C(=O)C(c3ccccc3)c4ccccc4

Properties
Chemical formula	C_{23}H_{16}O_{3}
Molar mass	340.378 g·mol^{−1}

Pharmacology
ATC code	B01AA10 (WHO)
- Except where otherwise noted, data are given for materials in their standard state (at 25 °C [77 °F], 100 kPa). verify (what is ?) Infobox references

Diphenadione is a vitamin K antagonist that has anticoagulant effects and is used as a rodenticide against rats, mice, voles, ground squirrels and other rodents. The chemical compound is an anti-coagulant with active half-life longer than warfarin and other synthetic 1,3-indandione anticoagulants.

It is toxic to mammals, in all forms; exposure and oral ingestion of the toxin may cause irregular heartbeat and major maladies associated with its impact on blood clotting, depending on dose. As a "second-generation" anticoagulant, diphenadione is more toxic than the first generation compounds (e.g., warfarin). For purposes of treating toxicity on exposure, diphenadione is grouped with other vitamin K antagonists (coumarins and indandiones); despite being directed at rodents and being judged as less hazardous to humans and domestic animals than other rodenticides in use (by the U.S. Environmental Protection Agency), indandione anticoagulants, nevertheless, "may cause human toxicity at a much lower dose than conventional 'first-generation anticoagulants'… and can bioaccumulate in the liver."

Rat poisons with diphacinone are often dyed bright blue to signal toxicity.
