= Chlorophacinone =

Names
- Preferred IUPAC name 2-[(4-Chlorophenyl)phenylacetyl]-1H-indene-1,3(2H)-dione

Identifiers
CAS Number	3691-35-8
3D model (JSmol)	Interactive image
ChemSpider	18286
ECHA InfoCard	100.020.912
KEGG	C18514
PubChem CID	19402
UNII	34Y6E0063Y
CompTox Dashboard (EPA)	DTXSID2032348
- InChI: InChI=1S/C23H15ClO3/c24-16-12-10-15(11-13-16)19(14-6-2-1-3-7-14)23(27)20-21(25)17-8-4-5-9-18(17)22(20)26/h1-13,19-20H Key: UDHXJZHVNHGCEC-UHFFFAOYSA-N; InChI=1/C23H15ClO3/c24-16-12-10-15(11-13-16)19(14-6-2-1-3-7-14)23(27)20-21(25)17-8-4-5-9-18(17)22(20)26/h1-13,19-20H Key: UDHXJZHVNHGCEC-UHFFFAOYAM
- SMILES: Clc1ccc(cc1)C(c2ccccc2)C(=O)C4C(=O)c3ccccc3C4=O

Properties
Chemical formula	C_{23}H_{15}ClO_{3}
Molar mass	374.82 g·mol^{−1}
- Except where otherwise noted, data are given for materials in their standard state (at 25 °C [77 °F], 100 kPa). verify (what is ?) Infobox references

Chlorophacinone is a first-generation anticoagulant rodenticide. The mechanism of action results in internal bleeding due to non-functional clotting factors. It was used as a toxin to control rodent populations. It is classified as an extremely hazardous substance in the United States as defined in Section 302 of the U.S. Emergency Planning and Community Right-to-Know Act (42 U.S.C. 11002) and is subject to strict reporting requirements by facilities which produce, store, or use it in significant quantities.

== History ==
The French company Liphatech (formerly known as Lipha), which had previous experience with creating anticoagulants for the treatment of heart patients, created chlorophacinone in 1961 and branded it “Rozol”. Chlorophacinone belongs to the first-generation anticoagulant rodenticide group, first being developed during the 1940s to 1960s to control rodents in terrestrial environments. Its use began being replaced during the 1970s, along with the use of other rodenticides of its group, by the more potent second-generation anticoagulant rodenticides, when several studies provided information which depicted a developed resistance of rodents to Warfarin (another first-generation anticoagulant rodenticide) in northern Europe and the United States along with a discovered cross-resistance to all first-generation anticoagulant rodenticides. This was found to be caused by a single, dominant and autosomal gene which raised the rodent's dietary requirement for vitamin K (the vitamin whose production anticoagulants primarily inhibited) to twenty times the normal amount. Even though its use has diminished, chlorophacinone can still be bought for rodenticide use, for situations in which conventional bait for rodenticidal purposes cannot be used.

== Structure and physical properties ==
Chlorophacinone is an organic compound with the following systematic name: (2-[2-(4-chlorophenyl)-2-phenylacetyl]indan-1,3-dione. The structure consists of an acetyl group, connected on one side to indanedione ring. Two phenyl groups are attached to the other side, one contains a chloride. Chlorophacinone contains one optically active carbon and therefore it occurs as two enantiomers.

Henry's law constant of 5.12 × 10^{−7} atm-m3/mol suggests a low potential to volatilize from water or soil into the atmosphere. It is dissolves relatively good in organic solvents like hexane (854 mg/L at 25 °C) and methanol (786 mg/L at 25 °C), compared to water (3.43 mg/L at 25 °C).

Appearance	Pale-yellow powder
Melting point	143.0 °C
Hazard statements	H360D: May damage the unborn child H300: Fatal if swallowed H310: Fatal in contact with skin H330: Fatal if inhaled H372: Causes damage to the blood through prolonged or repeated exposure H410: Very toxic to aquatic life with long lasting effects
Relative density	1.4301 g/mL
Vapour pressure	4.76 × 10^{−4} Pa at 23 °C
Henry's law constant	5.12 × 10^{−7} atm-m3/mol
UV/Vis absorption	~260 nm and 315 nm

== Synthesis ==
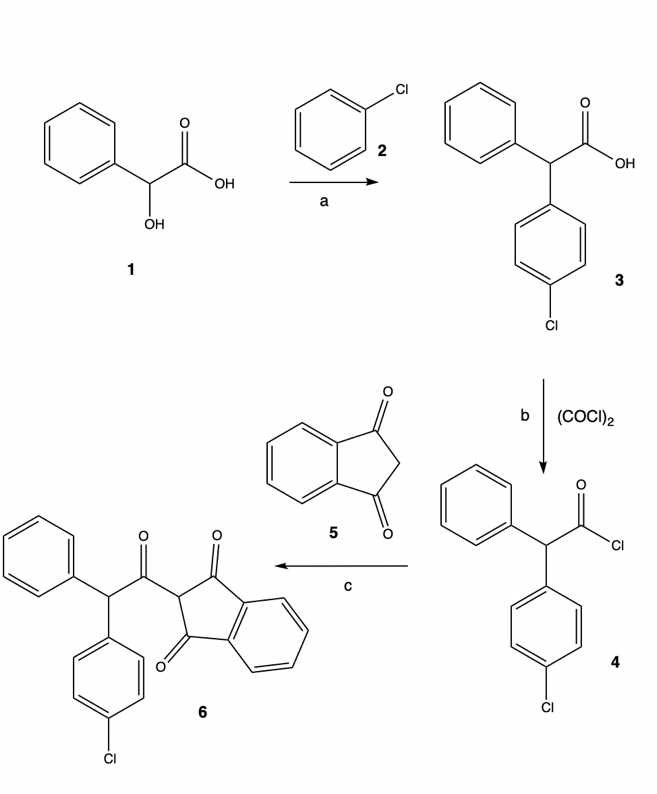
Figure 1: the synthesis of Chlorophacinone. a) SnCl4, 70°C, 8 h, 85%; b) 25°C, 12 h, quant; c) AlCl3, 25°C, 12h, 60%

Chlorophacinone can be synthesized through different mechanisms. A more recently studied mechanism will be discussed below (figure 1). In this synthesizes chlorophacinone is synthesized with less production of side products compared to the classic mechanisms.

The synthesis uses mandelic acid 1 as starting product as it is a cheap and commercially available. Mandelic acid reacts with chlorobenzene 2 in presence of SnCl_{4} to afford 85% of the phenylacetic acid 3. Thereafter, the phenylacetic acid is treated with oxalyl chloride at room temperature to obtain 6-chloro-2,2-diphenylacetyl chloride 4. No purification is needed to start the last step of the synthesis, which is a Friedel-Crafts reaction of the previously obtained compound 4 with 1,3- indanedione 5. This reaction provided the final product, chlorophacinone 6, with no significant amount of diphacinone or other side products.

== Mechanism of action ==
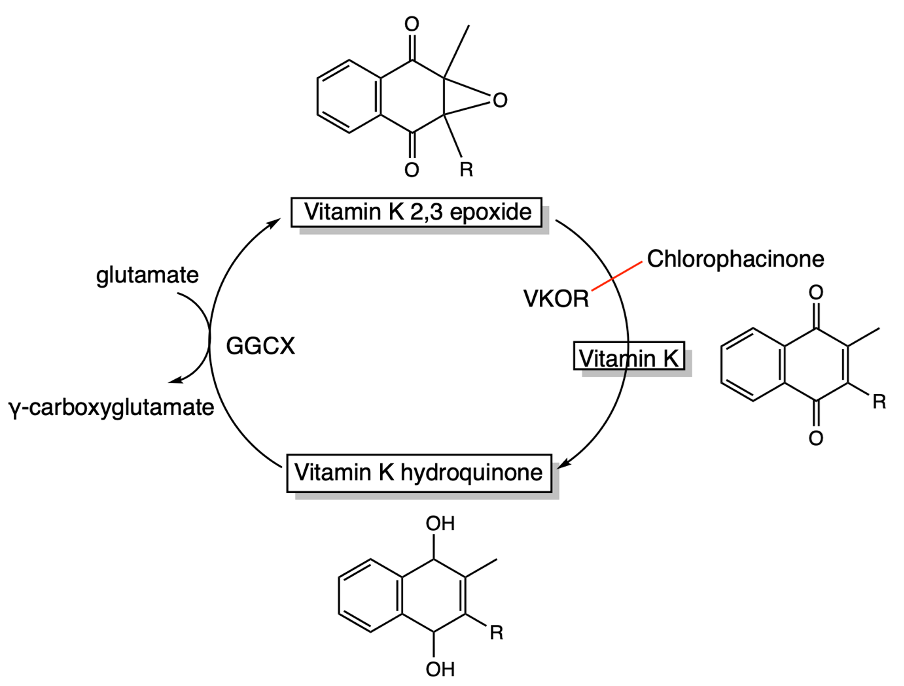
Figure 2: The vitamin K redox cycle and the inhibition of chlorophacinone of VKOR.

Chlorophacinone is a first-generation anticoagulant rodenticide. The compound is an indandione derivate. It acts as a vitamin K antagonist and exerts its anticoagulatory effect by interfering with the hepatic synthesis of vitamin K-dependent clotting factors. Synthesis of clotting factor II, VII, IX and X involves the posttranslational carboxylation of glutamate to γ-carboxyglutamate by the enzyme γ-glutamyl carboxylase (GGCX). The γ-carboxyglutamate residues promote the binding of clotting factors to phospholipids of the blood vessels, thereby accelerating coagulation. However, a vitamin K hydroquinone (KH_{2}) cofactor is needed for the carboxylation reaction to occur. The KH_{2} is converted to vitamin K 2,3 epoxide (KO) during the carboxylation reaction. The KH_{2} cofactor is created within the vitamin K redox cycle. Chlorophacinone interferes with the vitamin K redox cycle by inhibiting vitamin K epoxide reductase (VKOR), an integral membrane protein present in the endoplasmic reticulum (ER). The enzyme plays a vital role within this cycle. The catalytic activity of VKOR is required for the reduction of KO to vitamin K to KH_{2}. The inhibition of VKOR by chlorophacinone prevents the recycling of vitamin K from KO to KH_{2} (figure 2). Therefore, the supply of KH_{2} in the tissue will diminish, this in turn will decrease the carboxylation activity of γ-glutamyl carboxylase. Resulting in under-carboxylation of clotting factors, meaning they are no longer capable of binding to the endothelial surface of blood vessels, and thus are biologically inactive.

== Metabolism ==
The chlorophacinone is absorbed through the gastrointestinal tract and may also be absorbed through the skin and respiratory system. When orally ingested absorption of chlorophacinone peaks between 4 and 6 hours after initial ingesting. The compound has a half-life of approximately 10 hours. Highest concentrations of chlorophacinone are found in the liver and kidneys. Repeated oral dosing in rats suggests bioaccumulation in the liver. After 1–4 days of repeated exposure a steady-state phase is reached. The time it takes to reach a steady-state phase suggest rapid elimination of chlorophacinone from the body. Anticoagulants are rapidly and principally absorbed in the intestine. The rodenticide was found to metabolized in the liver. Metabolism is mediated by cytochrome P450 isozymes and ring hydroxylation also appears to be an important biotransformation step. Hydroxylation occurs on the phenyl and indandionyl rings, these metabolites can then further undergo conjugation with glucuronic acid prior to entering the systemic circulation, with potential enterohepatic recirculation. Hepatic metabolism is generally biphasic with a rapid initial phase and more prolonged terminal phase. However metabolite excretion pathways of chlorophacinone still remain poorly described. The major route of elimination of chlorophacinone is through the feces (~95%) however with minor excretion (<1%) through urine and respiration. 26% of chlorophacinone is excreted within eight hours post-exposure via the bile.

== Efficacy ==
Chlorophacinone is used as an anticoagulant rodenticide to control rodent populations in terrestrial environments. It has been proven to be very effective in efficacy studies in rats, mice and beavers. Out of the four toxicants strychnine, zinc phosphide, chlorophacinone and diphacinone, the efficacy of chlorophacinone has been proven to be the highest in controlling mountain beaver populations. Chronic ingestion of smaller doses over time proves to be more toxic than acute ingestion of the same dose, a common trait among anticoagulant rodenticides.

== Effects on animals ==
Belonging to the group of first-generation anticoagulant rodenticides, chlorophacinone has similar symptoms on animals as the other chemicals in its category. Specifically, after being ingested several times by the target animal (most often a rodent), it interferes with the clotting of the blood and leads to internal bleeding, eventually causing death within 5 to 7 days. This effect is due to the rodenticide's inhibition of the vitamin K(1)-2,3 epoxide reductase (VKOR) enzyme which is responsible for the synthesis of vitamin K and therefore the clotting factors II, VII, IX and X, factors critical to blood clotting, lack of which eventually causes mass hemorrhage inside the animal. Although internal bleeding is the usual cause of death in this category of rodenticides, chlorophacinone has also been shown to cause additional cardiopulmonary or neurologic symptoms in laboratory rats, often leading to their death before significant bleeding occurs.

== Toxicity ==
Chlorophacinone is classified as a highly toxic substance when administered orally, dermally, or through inhalation in mammals, falling under Toxicity Category I. It is not a dermal or eye irritant, or a dermal sensitizer (Toxicity Category IV). Accidental exposure incidents involving lambs have shown symptoms including epistaxis, respiratory distress, and facial and cervical swelling. Post-mortem examination in two of the affected lambs have revealed that all organs had a pale appearance, notably the liver, and that the lungs were heavier than usual and were slightly brownish. In four beavers exposed to 2.13 ± 0.4 mg/kg chlorophacinone, bleeding from the mouth, gasping for breath and convulsions were observed, and the beavers died within 15 days after exposure. Studies in rats have indicated that male rats experience more profound effects than female rats. Birds are not as sensitive to chlorophacinone as mammals, but they may still experience sublethal effects from it, such as external bleeding, internal hematoma and increased blood coagulation time. General toxic symptoms include dyspnea, lethargy, hemorrhage from the nose and urethral bleeding.

The LD_{50} values for different species:

Species	LD_{50} value (mg/kg)
Male rat	3.15
Female rat	10.95
Rabbit	0.329
Black-tailed prairie dog	1.94
Northern bobwhite	258
Redworm	>300

The SENSOR-pesticide database documented 12 human exposure cases involving chlorophacinone between 1998 and 2011. One was a moderate severity case, which involved an insulation worker being exposed to chlorophacinone dust by touching and/or inhaling it. The worker experienced shakiness, fever, and vomiting, as well as respiratory, neurological, gastrointestinal, renal and cardiovascular symptoms. Another case involved a homeowner who experienced shortness of breath and coughing after accidentally inhaling chlorophacinone. No carcinogenicity assessments have been conducted on chlorophacinone since chronic exposure is not likely to occur.

== Environmental risk ==
In order to control the population of animals such as prairie dogs, pocket gophers, mountain beavers and ground squirrels, chlorophacinone bait is distributed into burrow openings or on the ground just outside burrows. Although each placement is covered with grass or shingle to avoid exposing nontarget organisms and chlorophacinone is not likely to drain into soil, nontarget organisms could still be exposed to chlorophacinone by eating the bait. Predators could also eat animals poisoned with chlorophacinone, which is classified as secondary exposure, although multiple poisoned animals must be consumed to receive a lethal dose. The anticoagulant concentration is diluted ten-fold in secondary exposure, and even more when the predator also eats non-poisoned prey. Small, granivorous animals that share burrows with the target animal are mainly at risk to be exposed. In a study summarized by USEPA (2004), chlorophacinone baits were used to control California ground squirrels in rangelands, and nontarget deer mice and San Joaquin pocket mice were found dead with at least 86% of the mortalities likely due to bait exposure. The risk of chlorophacinone exposure to birds is minimal, and the aquatic and terrestrial plant exposure is considered negligible.

== See also ==
- 1,3-Indandione
