= Pindone =

Names
- Preferred IUPAC name 2-(2,2-Dimethylpropanoyl)-1H-indene-1,3(2H)-dione
- Other names 2-Pivaloyl-1,3-indandione

Identifiers
CAS Number	83-26-1
3D model (JSmol)	Interactive image
ChemSpider	6476
ECHA InfoCard	100.001.330
KEGG	C19141
PubChem CID	6732
UNII	2KFI1XBH7G
CompTox Dashboard (EPA)	DTXSID1025930
- InChI: InChI=1S/C14H14O3/c1-14(2,3)13(17)10-11(15)8-6-4-5-7-9(8)12(10)16/h4-7,10H,1-3H3 Key: RZKYEQDPDZUERB-UHFFFAOYSA-N; InChI=1/C14H14O3/c1-14(2,3)13(17)10-11(15)8-6-4-5-7-9(8)12(10)16/h4-7,10H,1-3H3 Key: RZKYEQDPDZUERB-UHFFFAOYAX
- SMILES: O=C2c1ccccc1C(=O)C2C(=O)C(C)(C)C

Properties
Chemical formula	C_{14}H_{14}O_{3}
Molar mass	230.26 g/mol
Appearance	Bright-yellow powder
Odor	almost none
Density	1.06 g/mL
Melting point	110 °C (230 °F; 383 K)
Solubility in water	0.002% (25°C)

Hazards
- Lethal dose or concentration (LD, LC)
LD_{50} (median dose)	280 mg/kg (rat, oral); 75 mg/kg (dog, oral); 150 mg/kg (rabbit, oral)
- NIOSH (US health exposure limits)
PEL (Permissible)	TWA 0.1 mg/m^{3}
REL (Recommended)	TWA 0.1 mg/m^{3}
IDLH (Immediate danger)	100 mg/m^{3}
- Except where otherwise noted, data are given for materials in their standard state (at 25 °C [77 °F], 100 kPa). verify (what is ?) Infobox references

Pindone is an organic compound. A derivative of 1,3-indandione, it is used as a rodenticide. Its mode of action is as a anticoagulant. for agricultural use. It is commonly used as a rodenticide in the management of rat and rabbit populations.

It is pharmacologically analogous to warfarin and inhibits the synthesis of vitamin K-dependent clotting factors.
