= 1,7-Bis(4-hydroxyphenyl)-1,4,6-heptatrien-3-one =

Natural product found in turmeric and ginger

Names
- Preferred IUPAC name (1E,4E,6E)-1,7-Bis(4-hydroxyphenyl)-1,4,6-heptatrien-3-one

Identifiers
CAS Number	(1E,4E,6E): 470466-05-8; (1Z,4E,6E): 149732-52-5
3D model (JSmol)	(1E,4E,6E): Interactive image
ChEBI	(1E,4E,6E): CHEBI:65502
ChEMBL	(1E,4E,6E): ChEMBL469419
ChemSpider	(1E,4E,6E): 8622469; (1Z,4E,6E): 30777515; (Unspecified stereochemistry): 28688976
PubChem CID	(1E,4E,6E): 10447050
- InChI: (1E,4E,6E): InChI=1S/C19H16O3/c20-17(10-7-16-8-13-19(22)14-9-16)4-2-1-3-15-5-11-18(21)12-6-15/h1-14,21-22H/b3-1+,4-2+,10-7+ Key: PALMCMYYFAHUGA-BPTNNVFMSA-N; (1Z,4E,6E): Key: PALMCMYYFAHUGA-ZRFKDBLFSA-N; (Unspecified stereochemistry): Key: PALMCMYYFAHUGA-UHFFFAOYSA-N
- SMILES: (1E,4E,6E): c1cc(ccc1C=CC=CC(=O)C=Cc2ccc(cc2)O)O

Properties
Chemical formula	C_{19}H_{16}O_{3}
Molar mass	292.334 g·mol^{−1}
Appearance	Yellow powder
Melting point	168–170 °C (334–338 °F; 441–443 K)
- Except where otherwise noted, data are given for materials in their standard state (at 25 °C [77 °F], 100 kPa). Infobox references

1,7-Bis(4-hydroxyphenyl)-1,4,6-heptatrien-3-one is a natural product, a curcuminoid antioxidant found in turmeric (Curcuma longa) and torch ginger (Etlingera elatior).

== Structure and isolation ==
The all-trans double bond isomer (1E,4E,6E)-1,7-bis(4-hydroxyphenyl)-1,4,6-heptatrien-3-one was first fully characterised when isolated from extracts of the rhizomes of turmeric (Curcuma longa) in 1993. It has subsequently been found in other species, including etlingera elatior. A very large number of similar compounds are found in turmeric and ginger. These have been extensively studied in their roles as antioxidants and for their potential pharmacological properties.

The (1Z) double bond isomer is poorly characterised in the literature and it and the compounds with unspecified stereochemistry may in fact be the parent all-E molecule.

== Properties ==
Mohamad et al. (2005) found that the curcuminoids 1,7-bis(4-hydroxyphenyl)-1,4,6-heptatrien-3-one, demethoxycurcumin, and 16-hydroxylabda-8(17),11,13-trien-15,16-olide inhibit lipid peroxidation more potently than does alpha-tocopherol.

== See also ==
- Diarylheptanoid
