= 1,3-Indandione =

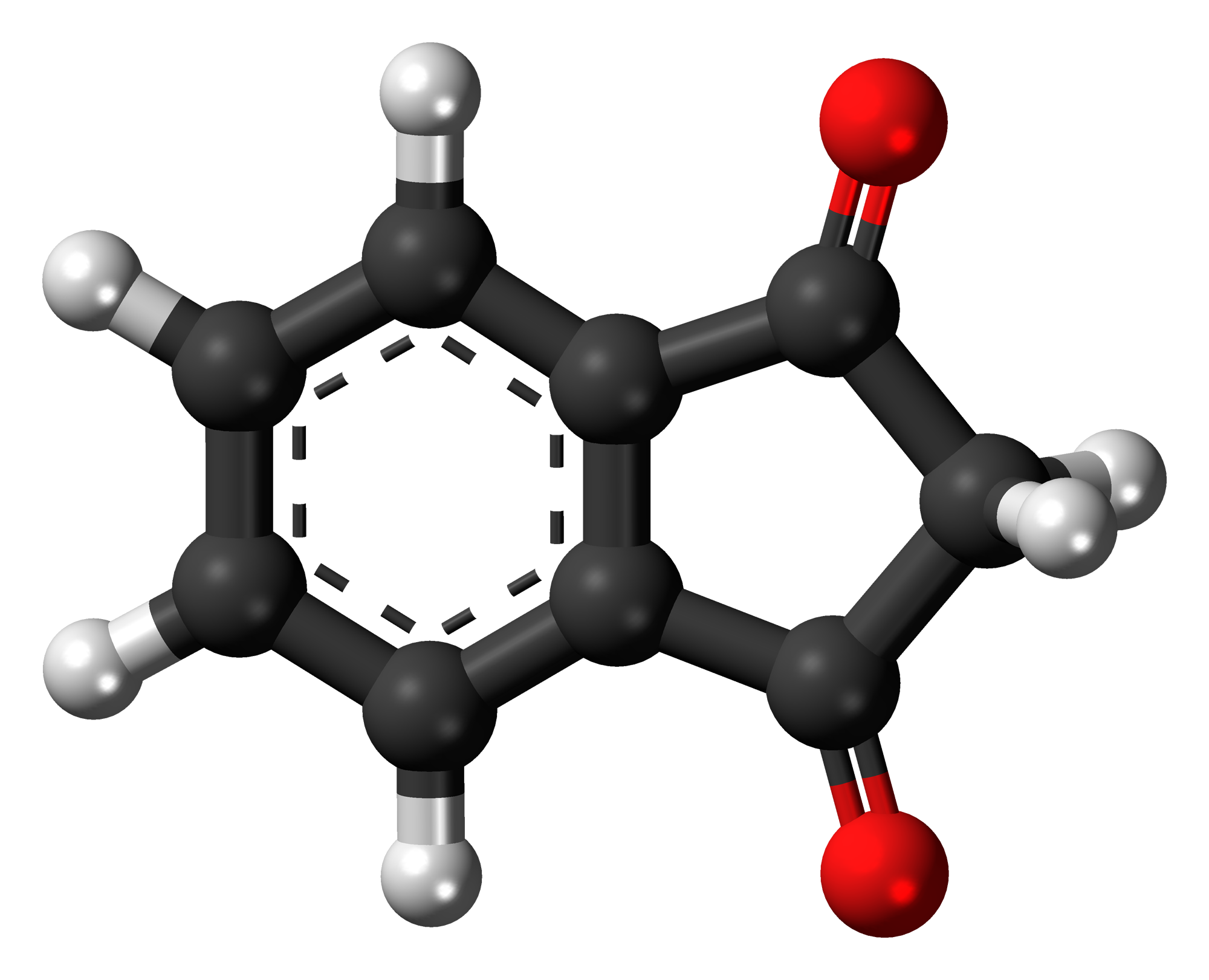

Names
- Preferred IUPAC name 1H-Indene-1,3(2H)-dione
- Other names Indandione; 1,3-Diketohydrindene; 1,3-Dioxoindane; 1,3-Hydrindendione

Identifiers
CAS Number	606-23-5
3D model (JSmol)	Interactive image; Interactive image
ChEBI	CHEBI:78877
ChEMBL	ChEMBL283521
ChemSpider	11322
ECHA InfoCard	100.009.191
PubChem CID	11815
UNII	4DJN7YG35G
CompTox Dashboard (EPA)	DTXSID2060547
- InChI: InChI=1S/C9H6O2/c10-8-5-9(11)7-4-2-1-3-6(7)8/h1-4H,5H2 Key: UHKAJLSKXBADFT-UHFFFAOYSA-N; InChI=1/C9H6O2/c10-8-5-9(11)7-4-2-1-3-6(7)8/h1-4H,5H2 Key: UHKAJLSKXBADFT-UHFFFAOYAR
- SMILES: C1C(=O)C2=CC=CC=C2C1=O; O=C2c1ccccc1C(=O)C2

Properties
Chemical formula	C_{9}H_{6}O_{2}
Molar mass	146.145 g·mol^{−1}
Appearance	white solid
Density	1.37 g/cm^{3}
Melting point	129 to 132 °C (264 to 270 °F; 402 to 405 K)
Solubility in water	slight
- Except where otherwise noted, data are given for materials in their standard state (at 25 °C [77 °F], 100 kPa). verify (what is ?) Infobox references

1,3-Indandione (sometimes simply indanedione) is an organic compound with the molecular formula C_{6}H_{4}(CO)_{2}CH_{2}. It is a β-diketone with indane as its structural nucleus. It is a colorless or white solid, but old samples can appear yellowish or even green. It is a popular chemical scaffold (building block of various useful chemical compounds), and derivatives antagonize Vitamin K receptors.

== Structural properties ==
Solid 1,3-indandione is a diketone, As a solution in water, it is partially (~2%) enolized. The enolate anion exhibits significant delocalization, and the highest electron density is on the second carbon. This acid-base behavior explains many properties of the compound.

== Preparation ==
Route to indandione

1,3-Indandione was first obtained by Claisen condensation of ethyl acetate and dimethyl phthalate. A related route entails the reaction of benzoyl chloride with malonyl dichloride. It also can be obtained by oxidation of indane.

== Chemical properties ==
Route to bi- and triindone

The structure of the title compound has been confirmed by X-ray crystallography. Unlike some other 1,3-diketones, it does not crystallize as the enol.

The carbon at the C-2 position is alpha to both carbonyls, and thus can act as a nucleophile. It undergoes self-aldol condensation easily, resulting in bi- and triindone.

Bromination occurs at the 2-position:

C_{6}H_{4}(CO)_{2}CH_{2} + 2 Br_{2} → C_{6}H_{4}(CO)_{2}CBr_{2} + 2HBr

One or both carbonyl groups can be reduced to alcohol groups or methylene groups, depending on the method used.

C_{6}H_{4}(CO)_{2}CH_{2} + H_{2} → C_{6}H_{4}(CHOH)(CO)CH_{2}
C_{6}H_{4}(CO)(CHOH)CH_{2} + H_{2} → C_{6}H_{4}(CHOH)_{2}CH_{2}
C_{6}H_{4}(CO)_{2}CH_{2} + 4 H_{2} → C_{6}H_{4}(CH_{2})_{2}CH_{2} + 2 H_{2}O

== Uses ==
Diphenadione a commercial rodenticide derived from 1,3-indandione

1,3-Indandiones with a substituent at the 2-position are potent rodenticides. Commercial products include pindone, chlorophacinone, and diphenadione. These compounds function as vitamin K antagonists, inducing hemorrhage in the affected animals.
