= Chinería Island =

Island in the Amazon River

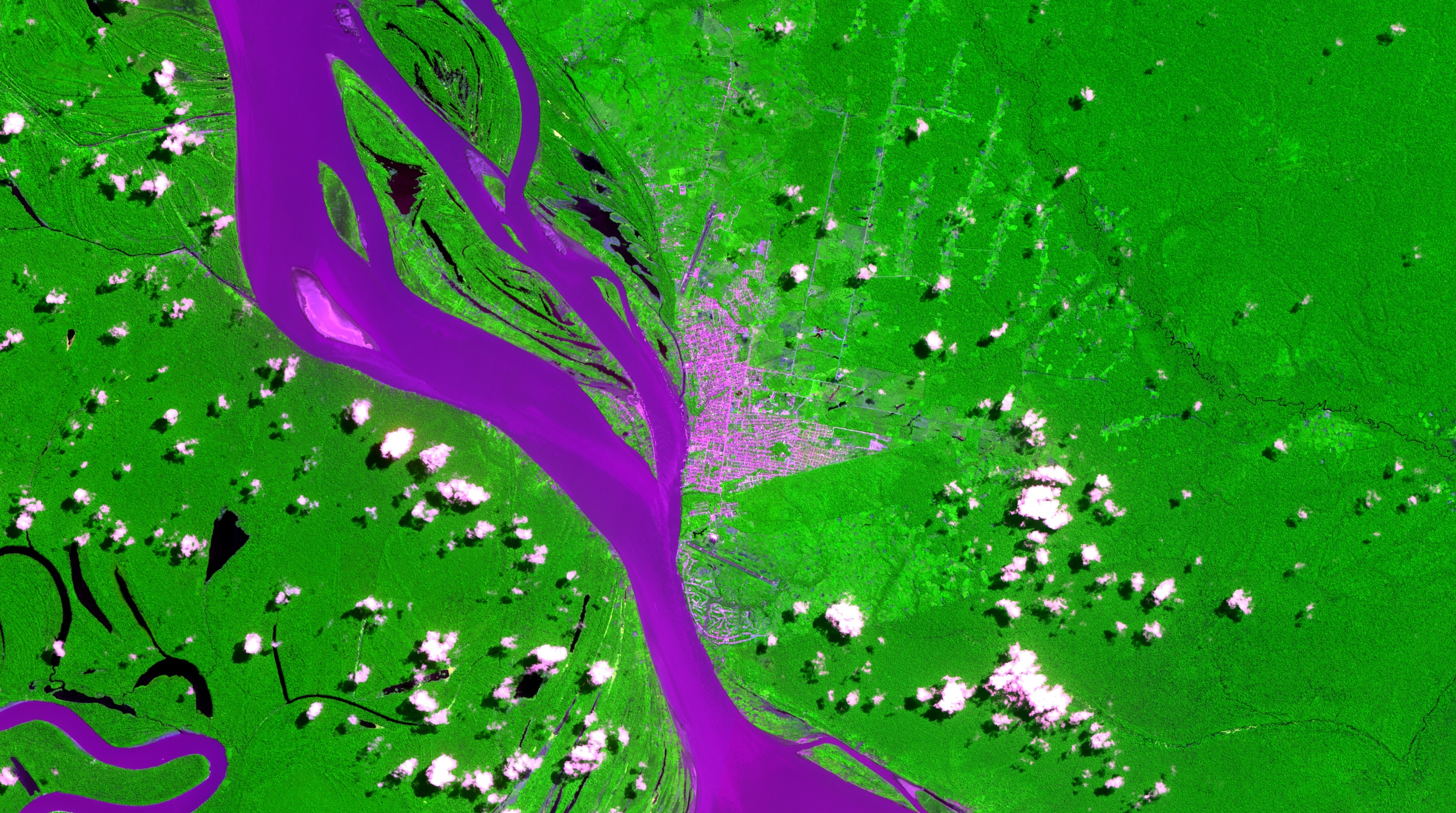
- Satellite view of Chinería, Santa Rosa, La Fantasía, and Ronda Islands near Tres Fronteras
- Interactive map of Chinería Island

Geography
- Location: Colombia–Peru border
- Coordinates: 4°11′12″S 69°59′42″W

Administration
- Peru
- District: Santa Rosa de Loreto
- Capital city: Santa Rosa de Yavarí

Chinería Island, also known as Rondiña Island, is a river island of the Amazon River located on the Peruvian side of the Colombia–Peru border. It is located to the northwest of Santa Rosa Island, and to the south of Ronda Island, the latter part of Colombia. It is administered as part of Santa Rosa de Loreto since 2025 (having previously been part of Yavari District), one of five districts of Mariscal Ramón Castilla, a province of the Department of Loreto.

Since 2024, its southern neighbour—considered by Peru to be part of Chinería Island itself—has been part of a territorial dispute with Colombia.

== Geography ==
The island is located on the Amazon River, which is part of the natural border between Colombia and Peru, near Tres Fronteras, the triple border between Peru, Colombia, and Brazil.

== History ==
During the 1970s, the island suffered a process of fluvial fragmentation that created its southern neighbour, known as Santa Rosa Island. This island has been disputed by the government of Colombia since 2024, whose president Gustavo Petro has accused Peru of usurping the island. The government of Peru has since rejected the Colombian accusation, claiming that the island did exist at one point, although it is no longer the case.

== See also ==
- Santa Rosa de Loreto District
- Colombian–Peruvian territorial dispute
