= Colombia–Peru border =

International border

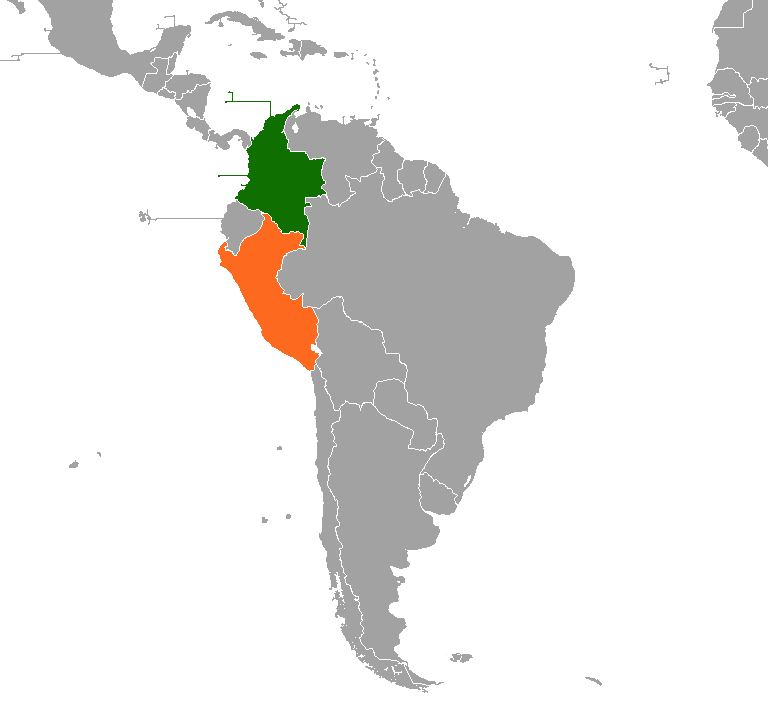

Characteristics
- Entities: Colombia Peru
- Length: 1,626 kilometres (1,010 mi)

History
- Established: 1739 (Real Cédula) 1922 (Salomón–Lozano Treaty) 1934 (Rio Protocol (1934))

The Colombia–Peru border is a 1,626 kilometres (1,010 mi) long continuous international border separating the territories of the two South American countries. It was originally established by the Salomón-Lozano Treaty of 24 March 1922 and then by the Río de Janeiro Protocol of 24 May 1934, which ended the Colombia-Peru War. Both agreements establish the border at the Putumayo River, with the exception of the Amazon Trapeze, located between the Putumayo and Amazon rivers, which is under the sovereignty of Colombia.

== Geography and definition ==
According to these treaties, the boundaries between Colombia and Perú are as follows:

The border is defined as:

- From the confluence of the Güepí and Putumayo rivers, between Peru, Ecuador and Colombia, downstream along the Putumayo River, to the mouth of the Yaguas River.
- A straight line drawn from the mouth of the Yaguas River, in Putumayo, to the mouth of the Atacuari River, in the Amazon.
- The Amazon River, downstream, following its course, to the mouth of the San Antonio ravine, where the border with Brazil begins.

The Colombian departments of Amazonas and Putumayo along with the Peruvian Department of Loreto form the border, which lies in the Amazon rainforest.

The main rivers that cross or form part of the border are the Güepí River, Putumayo River, Yaguas River, Atacuari River, Amazon River, and Loretoyacu River.

== Territorial dispute ==
The Colombian–Peruvian territorial dispute was a territorial dispute between Colombia and Peru, which, until 1916, also included Ecuador. The dispute had its origins on each country's interpretation of what Real Cedulas Spain used to precisely define its possessions in the Americas. After independence, all of Spain's former territories signed and agreed to proclaim their limits in the basis of the principle of uti possidetis juris, which regarded the Spanish borders of 1810 as the borders of the new republics. However, conflicting claims and disagreements between the newly formed countries eventually escalated to the point of armed conflicts on several occasions.

The dispute between both states ended in the aftermath of the Colombia–Peru War, which led to the signing of the Rio Protocol two years later, finally establishing a border agreed upon by both parties to the conflict.

Since 2024, a new conflict has focused on Santa Rosa, an island near Tres Fronteras that separated from Chinería Island through a natural process of fluvial fragmentation in the 1970s.

== Cities and villages ==
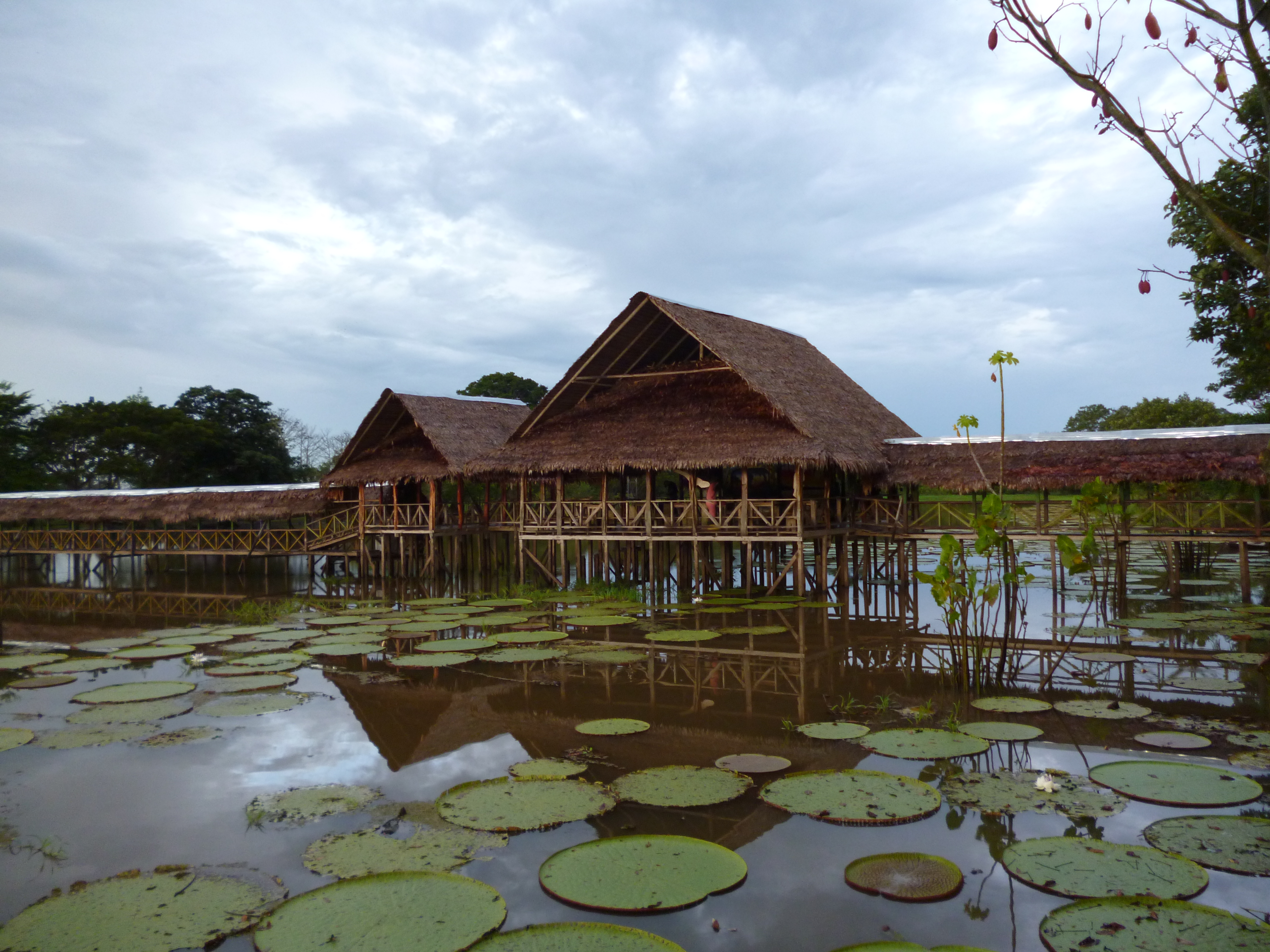
Leticia in Colombia

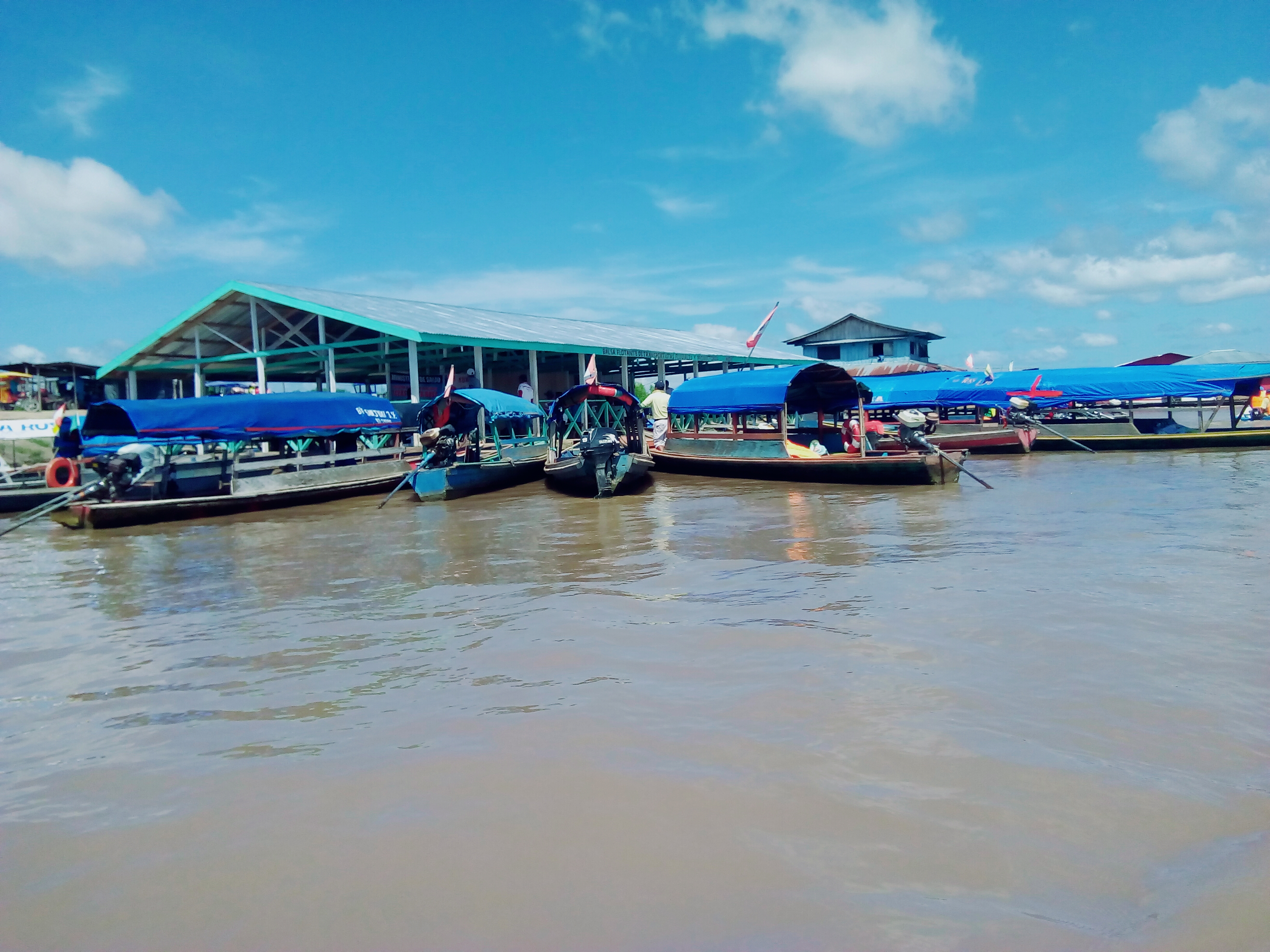
River-side in Santa Rosa de Yavarí in Perú

Colombia
- Arica
- El Encanto
- La Chorrera
- La Libertad
- Leticia
- Puerto Alegria
- Puerto Arica
- Puerto Colombia
- Puerto Leguízamo
- Puerto Nariño
- San Juan de Atacuari
- Tarapacá
Peru
- Güepí
- Soplín Vargas
- Angusilla
- Flor de Agosto
- Florida
- Santa Mercedes
- Puerto Limón
- Santa Clotilde
- San Antonio del Estrecho
- Teniente Berggerie
- Remanso
- Yaguas
- Caballococha
- Francisco de Orellana
- Santa Rosa de Yavarí
- Iquitos

== See also ==
- Tres Fronteras
- Borders of Colombia
- Colombian-Peruvian territorial dispute
