= Santa Rosa Island (Amazon River) =

Island in the Amazon River

Disputed island
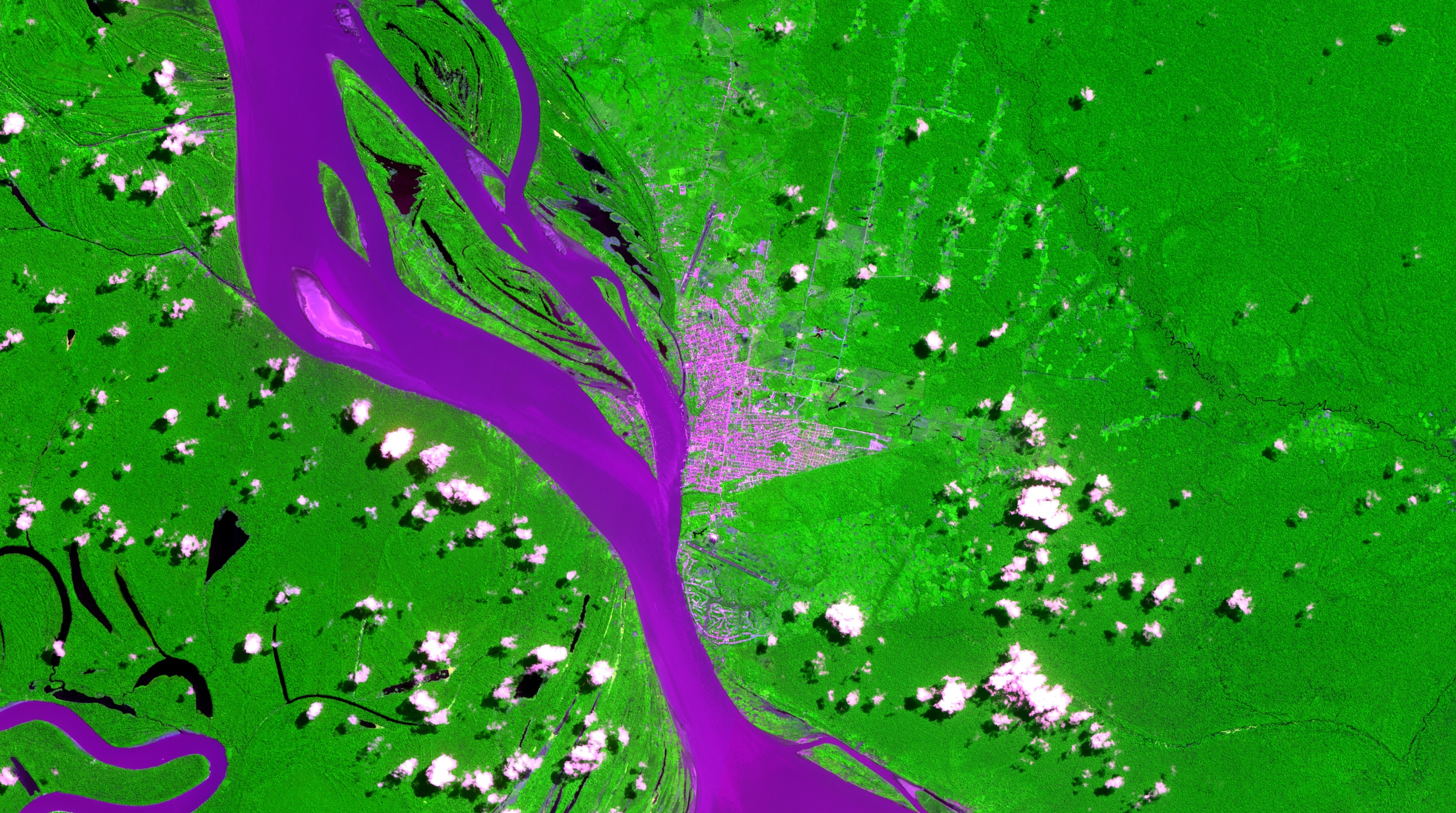
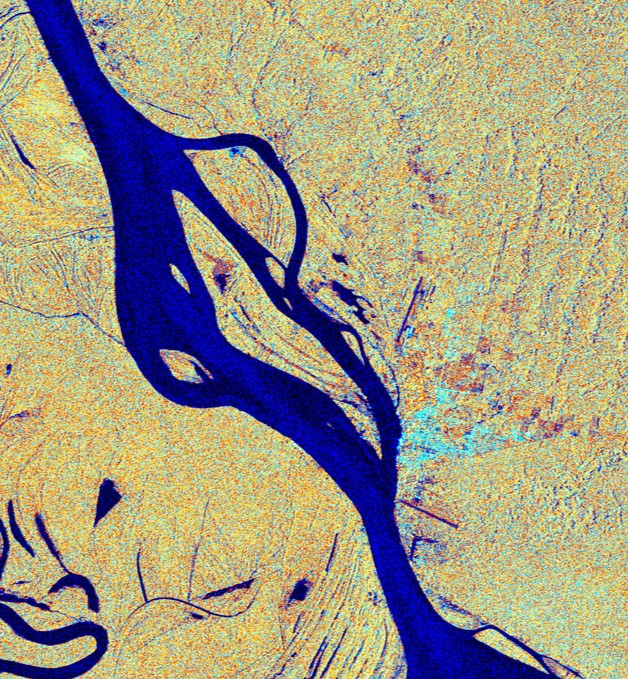
- Interactive map of Santa Rosa Island

Geography
- Location: Colombia–Peru border
- Coordinates: 4°13′26″S 69°57′43″W

Administration
- Peru
- District: Santa Rosa de Loreto

Claimed by
- Colombia
- Municipality: Leticia

Santa Rosa, also known as Santa Rosa de Yavarí and Santa Rosa de Loreto, is a disputed river island located in the Strait of Nazareth, the easternmost part of the Amazon River in Colombian and Peruvian territory, and the southernmost limit of the Amazon Trapeze, which forms part of the Colombia–Peru border. It is located close to Tres Fronteras, the tripoint of Brazil, Colombia and Peru. Its largest settlement is Santa Rosa de Yavarí.

It separated from Chinería Island around 1970 through a natural process of fluvial fragmentation. However, the channel that separated both islands has since dried up. The official position of the Peruvian Foreign Ministry is that the island no longer exists, and that it is part of Chinería Island.

== Name ==
The island is named after an image of Rose of Lima brought by the Civil Guard to a newly formed outpost.

== Geography ==
The island is located on the Amazon River, which is part of the natural border between Colombia and Peru, near Tres Fronteras, the triple border between Peru, Colombia, and Brazil. It is located south of Chinería Island and Ronda Island, administered by Peru and Colombia, respectively.

== History ==
According to the Peruvian government, the island is part of Santa Rosa de Loreto District, created on July 3, 2025, through Law N° 32403, approved by the Congress of Peru following the initiative of President Dina Boluarte. Formerly part of Yavari District, its capital is Santa Rosa de Yavarí, one of three border crossings of Tres Fronteras. Its creation led to the protest of president of Colombia Gustavo Petro, who claimed that Peru had usurped Colombian territory, and announced that the celebrations of the Battle of Boyacá would be moved to nearby Leticia in response.

Since 2004, the Peruvian government's National Registry of Identification and Civil Status (RENIEC) operates a branch in the island.

== See also ==
- Santa Rosa de Loreto District
- Colombia–Peru border
