= Santa Rosa de Loreto District =

District of Loreto, Peru

Santa Rosa de Loreto
- District
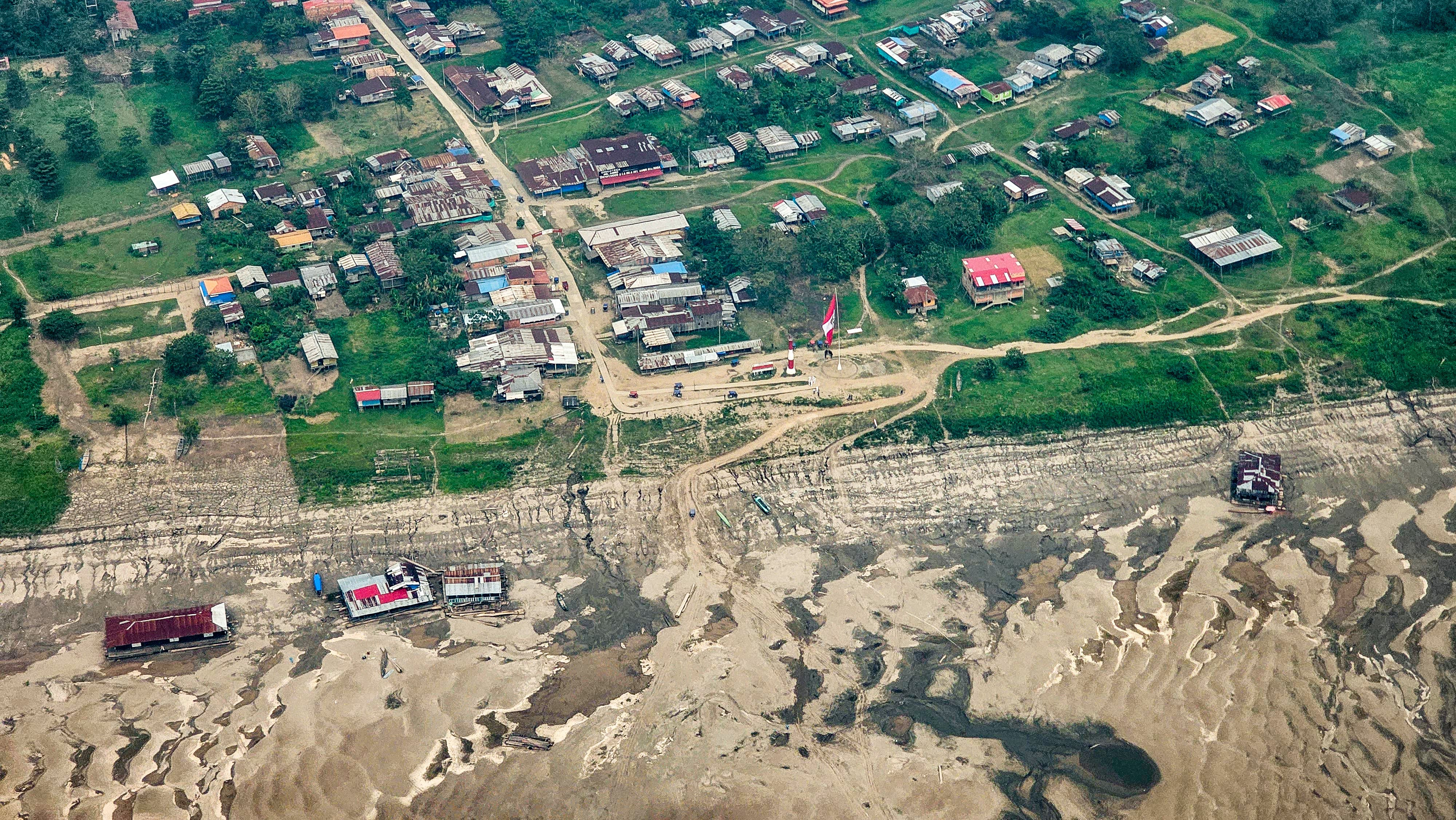
- Aerial view of Santa Rosa de Yavarí

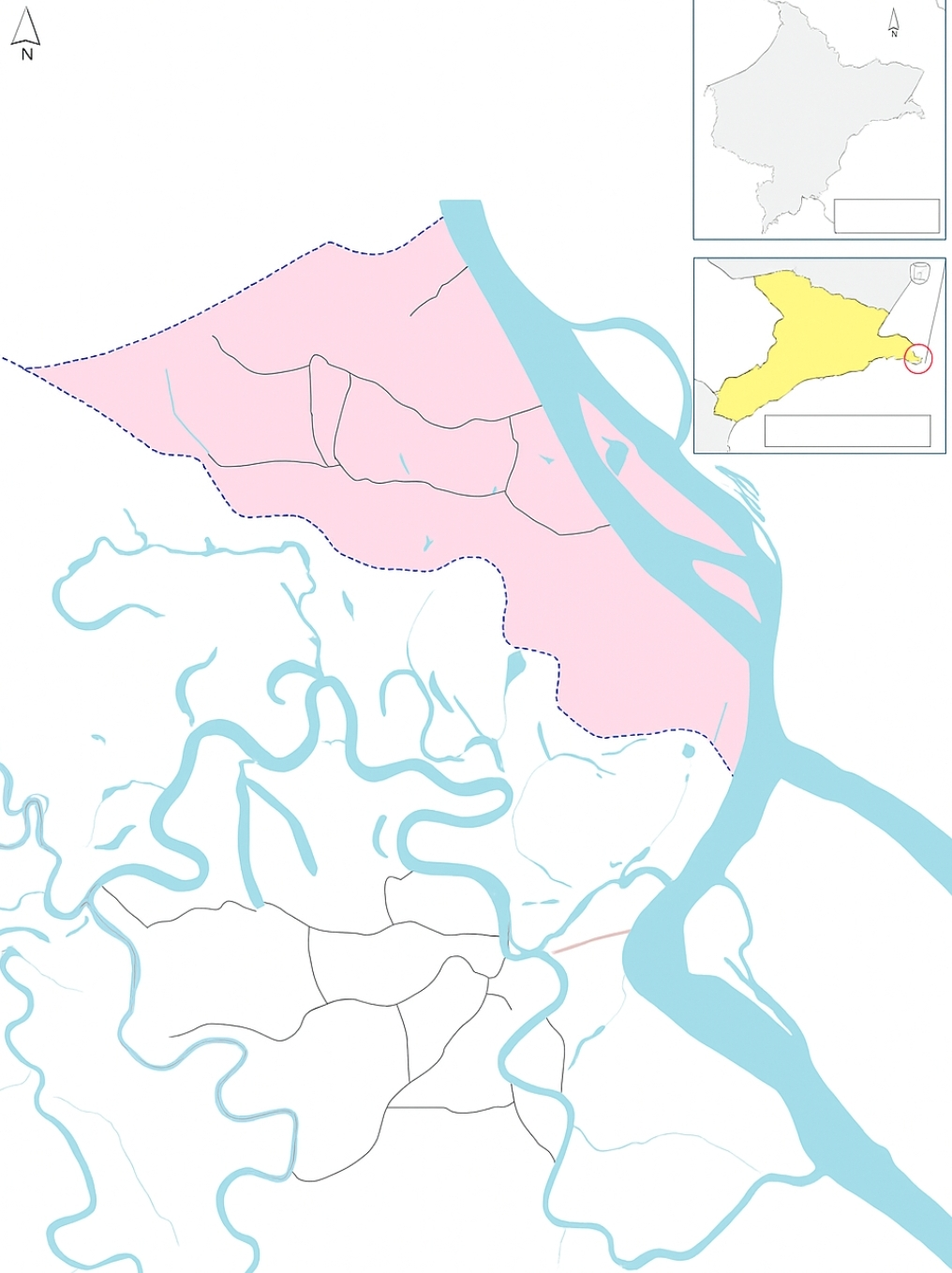
- Country: Peru
- Region: Loreto
- Province: Mariscal Ramón Castilla
- Founded: July 3, 2025
- Capital: Santa Rosa de Yavarí

Government
  - Mayor: Max Ortiz Rubio

Area
  - Total: 380.54 km^{2} (146.93 sq mi)

Population (2025)
  - Total: 3,000
  - Density: 7.9/km^{2} (20/sq mi)
- Time zone: UTC-5 (PET)

Santa Rosa de Loreto is one of the five districts of Mariscal Ramón Castilla Province in Peru. From the administrative point of view of the Catholic Church in Peru, it forms part of the Apostolic Vicariate of San José de Amazonas. It is located near Tres Fronteras, the triple border between Peru, Colombia and Brazil.

== History ==
External image
- A map by the Presidency of the Council of Ministers of the district

Proposals to create the district date back to 2010, when efforts took place until their approval in 2021. The district was officially created on July 3, 2025, through Law N° 32403, approved by the Congress of Peru following the initiative of President Dina Boluarte. Formerly part of Yavari District, its capital is Santa Rosa de Yavarí, one of three border crossings of Tres Fronteras.

The district was provisionally administered by Jack Iván Yovera Peña, provincial mayor of Mariscal Ramón Castilla, until Max Ortiz Rubio, who had been mayor of the populated centre back in 2018, was chosen as interim mayor in August. A temporary board of neighbourhood delegates was established until the election of authorities in the local elections of September 2025.

Its creation and inclusion of Santa Rosa Island led to the protest of president of Colombia Gustavo Petro, who claimed that Peru had usurped Colombian territory, and announced that the celebrations of the Battle of Boyacá would be moved to nearby Leticia in response.

== Politics ==
=== List of mayors ===
Mayor	Party	Term	
Mayor	Party	Begin	End
Jack Iván Yovera Peña (caretaker)	—N/a	July 3, 2025	August 2025
Max Ortiz Rubio (interim)	—N/a	August 2025	Incumbent

=== Subdivisions ===
The district has two populated centres:

- Santa Rosa de Yavarí (district capital): 976 inhabitants
- Centro Poblado Menor Isla Santa Rosa: 800 inhabitants (approx.)

== See also ==
- Mariscal Ramón Castilla province
- La Yarada-Los Palos District
- Districts of Peru
