= Peperomia verediana =

Scientific classification
- Kingdom: Plantae
- Clade: Embryophytes
- Clade: Tracheophytes
- Clade: Angiosperms
- Clade: Magnoliids
- Order: Piperales
- Family: Piperaceae
- Genus: Peperomia
- Species: P. verediana

Binomial name
- Peperomia verediana Trel.

Species of plant

Peperomia verediana is a species of plant from the genus Peperomia. It was discovered by William Trelease in 1936.

== Etymology ==
Verediana came from the Spanish word "Vereda". Vereda defines a scattered settlement in Latin America.

== Distribution ==
Peperomia verediana is endemic to Loreto, Peru. Specimens were collected by Llewelyn Williams in Caballococha, Loreto.

- Peru
  - Loreto
    - Caballococha
      - Amazon River

== Description ==
It is a medium-sized glabrous herb with stems 2-3 millimeters thick. Leaves alternate from broadest near the base, having a slightly pointed tip, rounded at the base, and minutely cordate at the margin. Leaves are 5.5-6.5 centimeters long, and 3.5-4 centimeters wide. Petioles are 2 centimeters long. Inflorescence is not present in this species.
