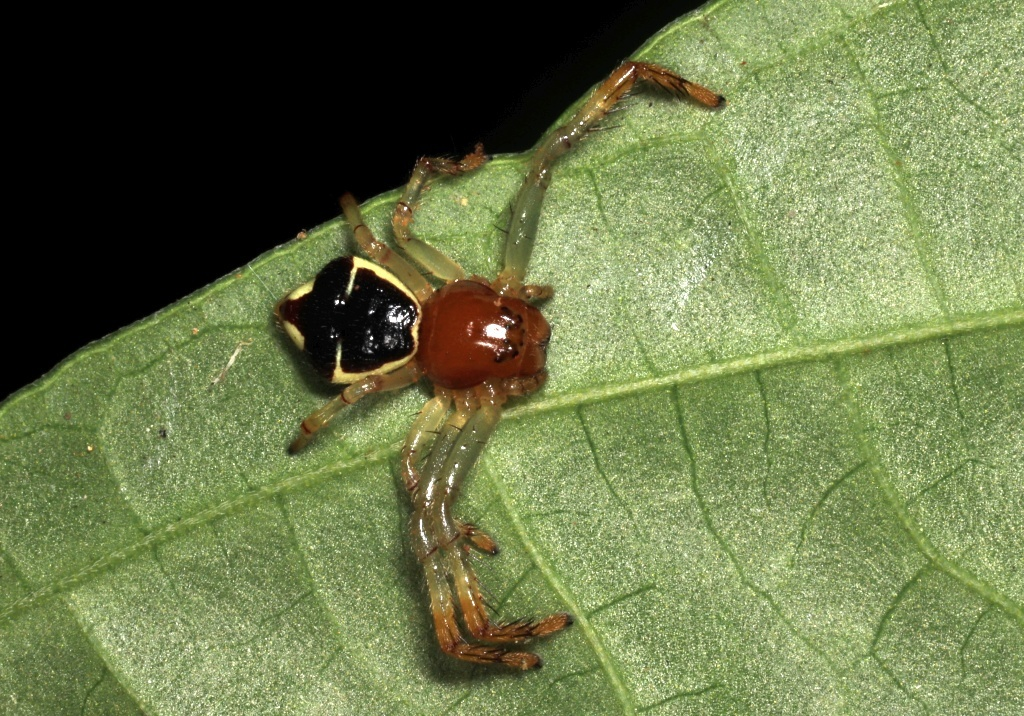
- female from Peru
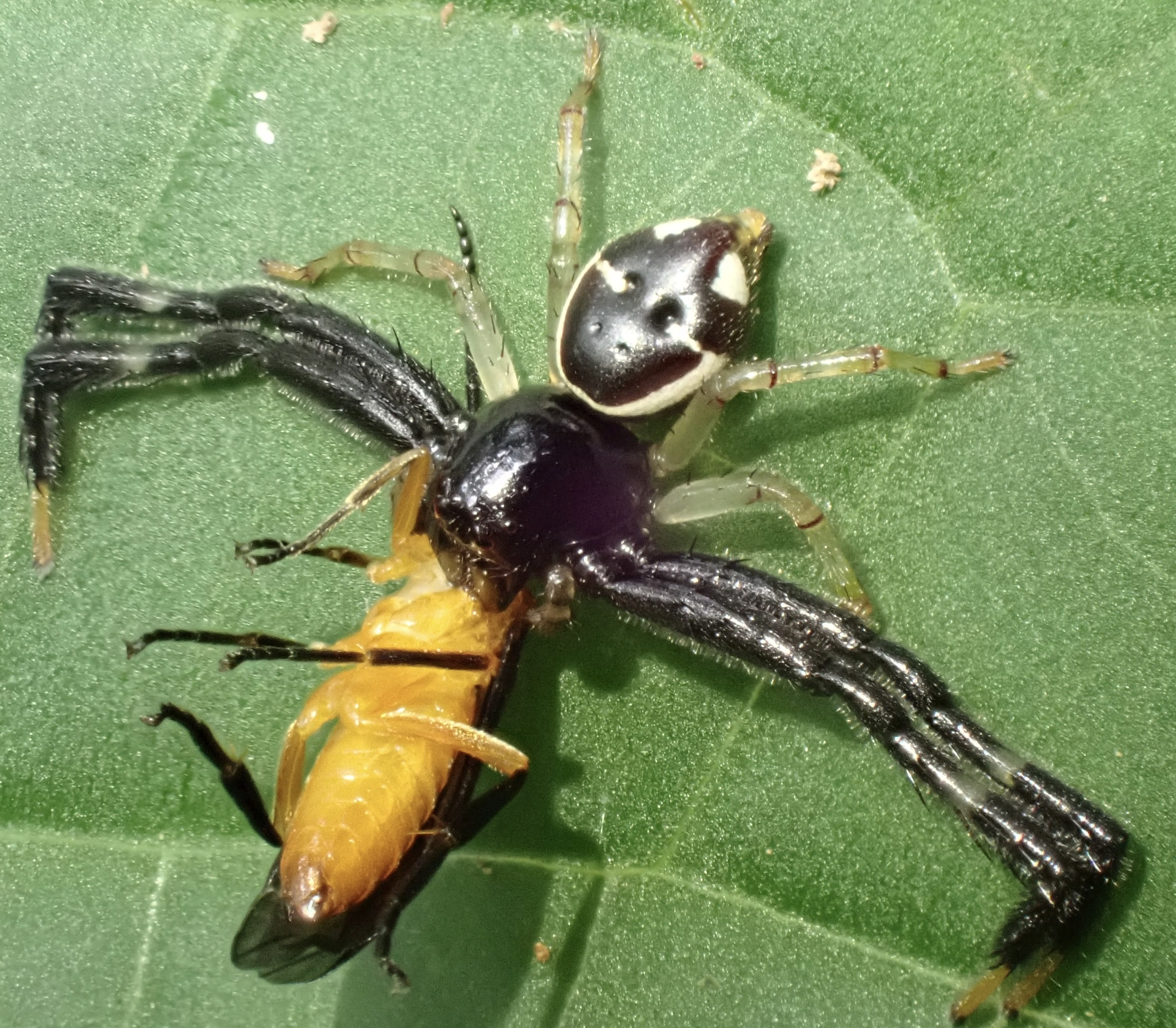
- male from Colombia

Scientific classification
- Kingdom: Animalia
- Phylum: Arthropoda
- Subphylum: Chelicerata
- Class: Arachnida
- Order: Araneae
- Infraorder: Araneomorphae
- Family: Thomisidae
- Genus: Stephanopoides
- Species: S. simoni

Binomial name
- Stephanopoides simoni Keyserling, 1880

Synonyms
- Synema jocosum Banks, 1929; Pyresthesis berlandi Caporiacco, 1947; Browningella browningi Mello-Leitão, 1948

= Stephanopoides simoni =

Species of crab spider

Stephanopoides simoni is a species of crab spider in the family Thomisidae. It is found in South America and Central America.

It is named in honor of Eugène Simon.

== Taxonomy ==
The species was first described by Eugen von Keyserling in 1880. Over the years, several other species have been synonymized with S. simoni. Browningella browningi was synonymized by Bonaldo & Lise in 2001, Synema jocosum was synonymized by Quintero & Miranda in 2008, and Pyresthesis berlandi was synonymized by Teixeira & Barros in 2015.

== Distribution ==
Stephanopoides simoni is distributed across much of tropical South America and extends into Central America. It has been recorded from Panama, Venezuela, Colombia, Bolivia, Peru, Guyana, and Brazil. Historical records include specimens from the Brazilian states of Pará and Amazonas, including localities such as Tefé, São Paulo de Olivença, and Tabatinga, as well as Peruvian locations including Pebas and Iquitos.

== Description ==
Stephanopoides simoni shows typical sexual dimorphism common in crab spiders. Females are larger, measuring 8.0 to 12.0 mm in body length. The dorsal surface of the abdomen is greyish with an inverted U-shaped marking at the front, from which oblique bands extend to two posterior fulvous (orange-brown) spots. Behind this U-marking are two large white triangular patches separated by a broad dark band that narrows posteriorly.

Males are considerably smaller, measuring 5.0 to 6.0 mm in body length. The cephalothorax and chelicerae are dark, similar to the first two pairs of legs, though these have yellow tarsi and a yellow ring around the middle third of the tibiae. The posterior legs are yellow. The abdominal pattern is similar to that of females but includes six fulvous spots arranged in a rectangular pattern that is much wider than it is long.
