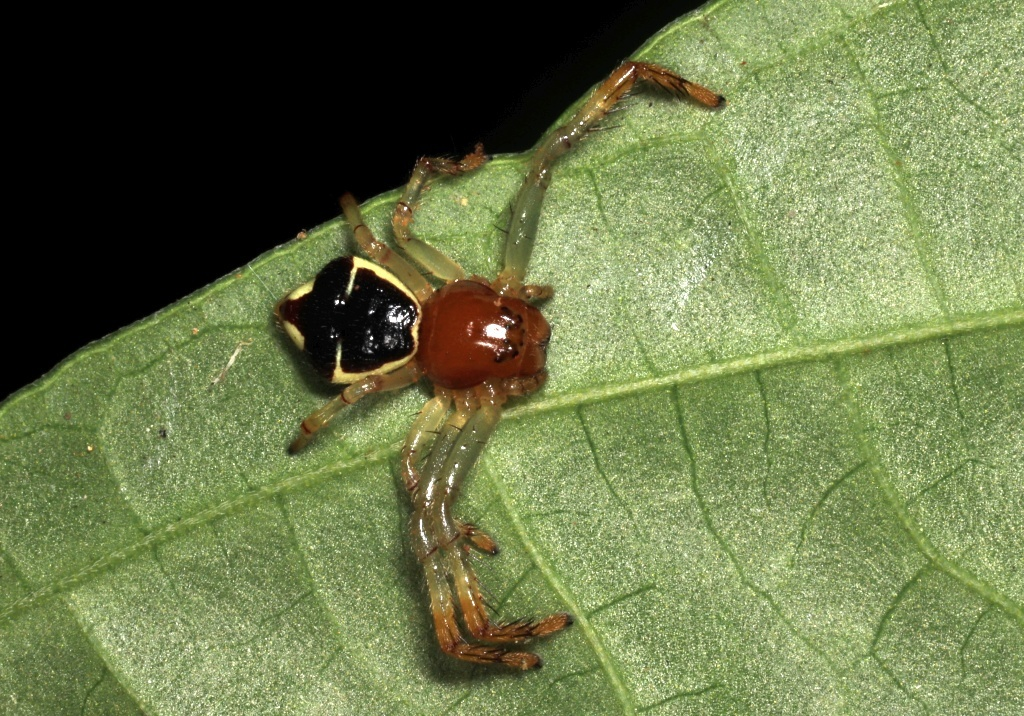
- female S. simoni

Scientific classification
- Kingdom: Animalia
- Phylum: Arthropoda
- Subphylum: Chelicerata
- Class: Arachnida
- Order: Araneae
- Infraorder: Araneomorphae
- Family: Thomisidae
- Genus: Stephanopoides; Keyserling

Type species
- Stephanopoides brasiliana

Species
- Stephanopoides brasiliana Keyserling, 1880 – Panama, Colombia, Brazil; Stephanopoides cognata O. Pickard-Cambridge, 1892 – Panama, Venezuela, Colombia, Brazil; Stephanopoides sexmaculata Mello-Leitão, 1929 – Brazil, Argentina; Stephanopoides simoni Keyserling, 1880 – Panama, Venezuela, Colombia, Bolivia, Peru, Guyana, Brazil

= Stephanopoides =

Genus of spiders

Stephanopoides is a genus of spiders in the family Thomisidae. It was first described in 1880 by Keyserling. As of 2017, it contains 4 species.
