= Benjamin Constant, Amazonas =

Municipality in Amazonas, Brazil

Benjamin Constant
- Municipality
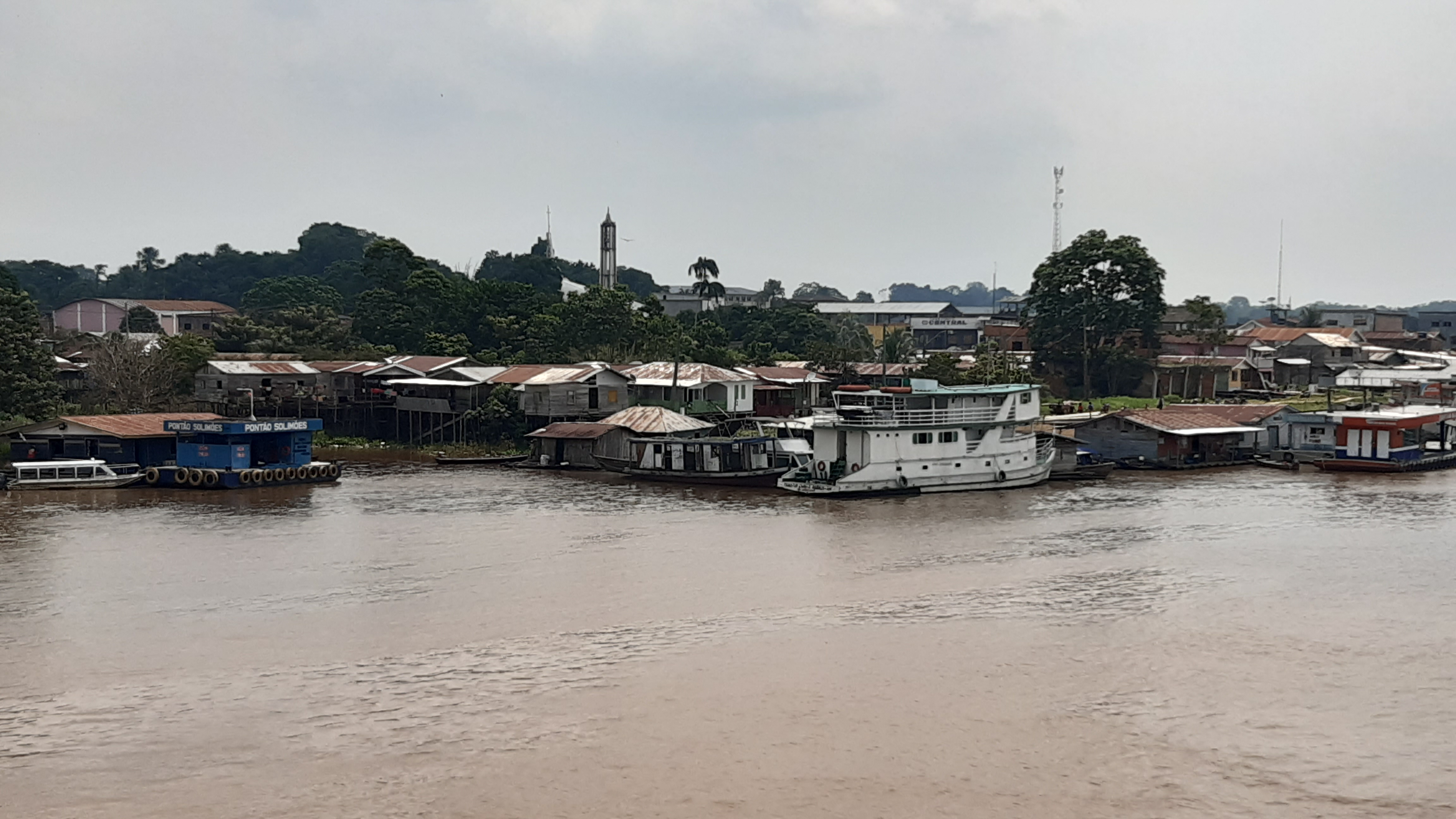
- View from the river

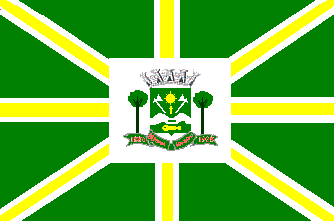
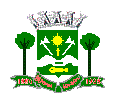
- Flag Coat of arms

- Location of the municipality inside Amazonas

- Location in Brazil
- Coordinates: 4°22′58″S 70°1′51″W
- Country: Brazil
- Region: North
- State: Amazonas

Population (2020)
  - Total: 43,935
- Time zone: UTC−5 (ACT)
- Website: http://www.benjaminconstant.am.gov.br/

Benjamin Constant is a municipality located in the Brazilian state of Amazonas. Its population was 43,935 (2020) and its area is 8,793 km^{2} (5,495 mi^{2}).

== History ==
The area is inhabited by Ticuna Indians. The Magüta Museum in the town is devoted to their culture and language. In 1988 the town was the scene of the murder of 14 Ticunas in a dispute between them and logging interests.

The town was named after the Brazilian revolutionary Benjamin Constant (1836–1891).

== Geography ==
The town is located by the confluence of the Javary River and the Amazon, close to the border with Peru. However, there are no customs or immigration facilities in Benjamin Constant, and entry and exit formalities take place at Tabatinga on the opposite bank of the Amazon. There are no roads into Benjamin Constant and the only access is by river boat. By fast boat it is about 31 hours from Manaus (about 7 days by slow boat). The nearest airport is at Tabatinga, 2 hours by boat.

=== Climate ===
Climate data for Benjamin Constant, Amazonas (1981–2010, extremes 1932–present)
Month	Jan	Feb	Mar	Apr	May	Jun	Jul	Aug	Sep	Oct	Nov	Dec	Year
Record high °C (°F)	37.2 (99.0)	37.0 (98.6)	37.2 (99.0)	36.2 (97.2)	35.9 (96.6)	36.2 (97.2)	37.0 (98.6)	39.0 (102.2)	39.5 (103.1)	40.0 (104.0)	37.3 (99.1)	36.7 (98.1)	40.0 (104.0)
Mean daily maximum °C (°F)	31.3 (88.3)	31.2 (88.2)	31.6 (88.9)	31.6 (88.9)	31.1 (88.0)	30.9 (87.6)	31.3 (88.3)	32.3 (90.1)	32.5 (90.5)	32.8 (91.0)	32.1 (89.8)	31.3 (88.3)	31.7 (89.1)
Daily mean °C (°F)	26.0 (78.8)	26.0 (78.8)	26.1 (79.0)	26.1 (79.0)	25.9 (78.6)	25.5 (77.9)	25.6 (78.1)	25.9 (78.6)	26.2 (79.2)	26.5 (79.7)	26.3 (79.3)	25.9 (78.6)	26.0 (78.8)
Mean daily minimum °C (°F)	21.8 (71.2)	21.8 (71.2)	21.9 (71.4)	22.0 (71.6)	21.7 (71.1)	21.2 (70.2)	20.8 (69.4)	21.1 (70.0)	21.5 (70.7)	21.9 (71.4)	22.0 (71.6)	22.0 (71.6)	21.6 (70.9)
Record low °C (°F)	16.8 (62.2)	16.0 (60.8)	14.9 (58.8)	15.0 (59.0)	14.9 (58.8)	11.2 (52.2)	9.9 (49.8)	13.2 (55.8)	14.1 (57.4)	17.9 (64.2)	14.4 (57.9)	16.0 (60.8)	9.9 (49.8)
Average precipitation mm (inches)	331.9 (13.07)	283.6 (11.17)	299.3 (11.78)	261.6 (10.30)	208.3 (8.20)	145.6 (5.73)	107.8 (4.24)	105.9 (4.17)	136.0 (5.35)	210.8 (8.30)	247.1 (9.73)	252.9 (9.96)	2,590.8 (102.00)
Average precipitation days (≥ 1.0 mm)	18	16	16	15	14	11	10	9	10	13	15	17	164
Average relative humidity (%)	86.7	86.7	86.7	87.2	87.5	86.9	85.3	84.2	83.5	84.2	85.5	86.3	85.9
Mean monthly sunshine hours	99.4	92.7	103.5	115.6	114.6	111.0	141.4	152.6	149.2	137.5	123.0	107.5	1,448
Source 1: Instituto Nacional de Meteorologia
Source 2: Meteo Climat (record highs and lows)

== Gallery ==
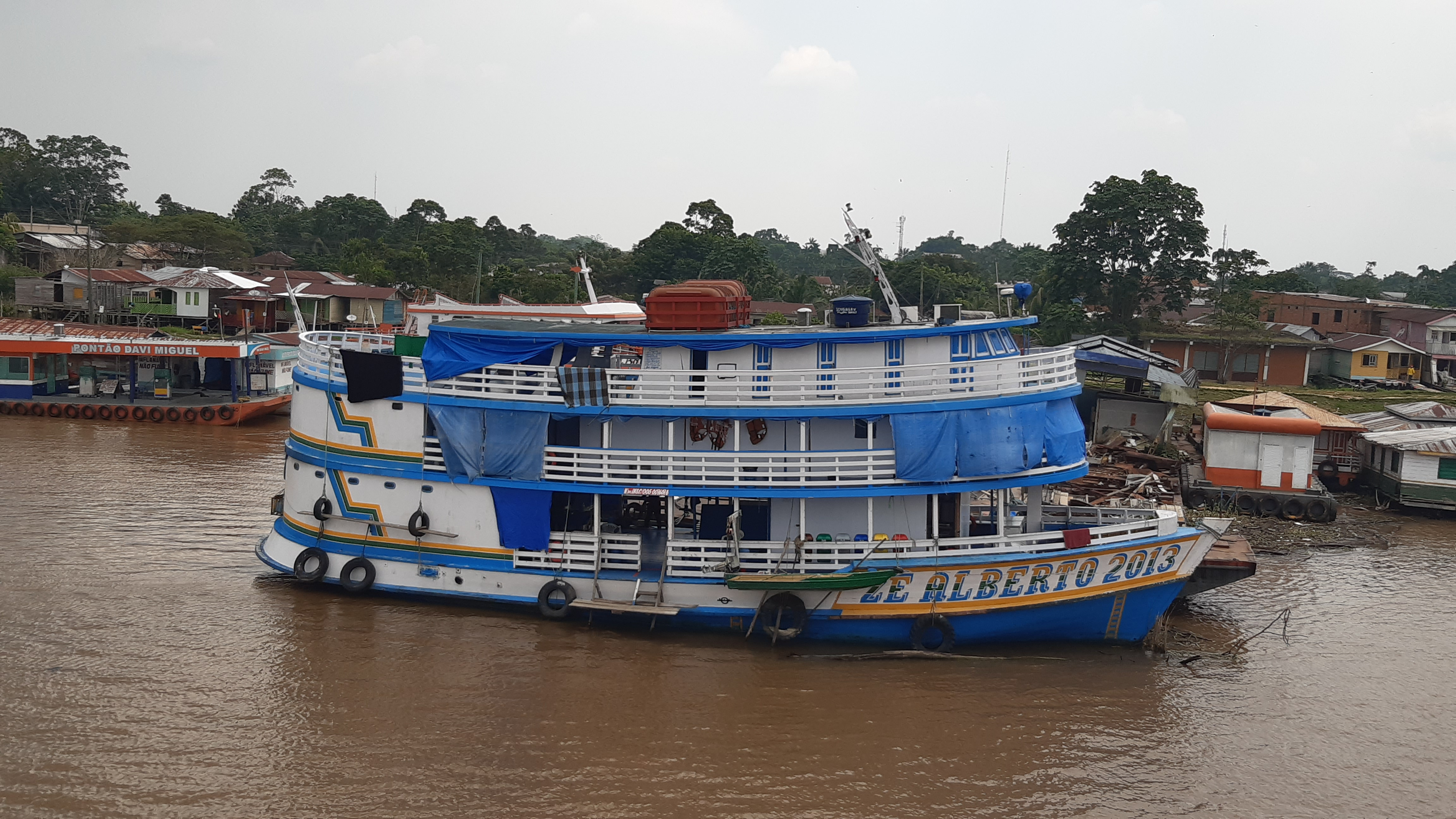
A passenger boat (Ze Alberto 2013) docked at the town

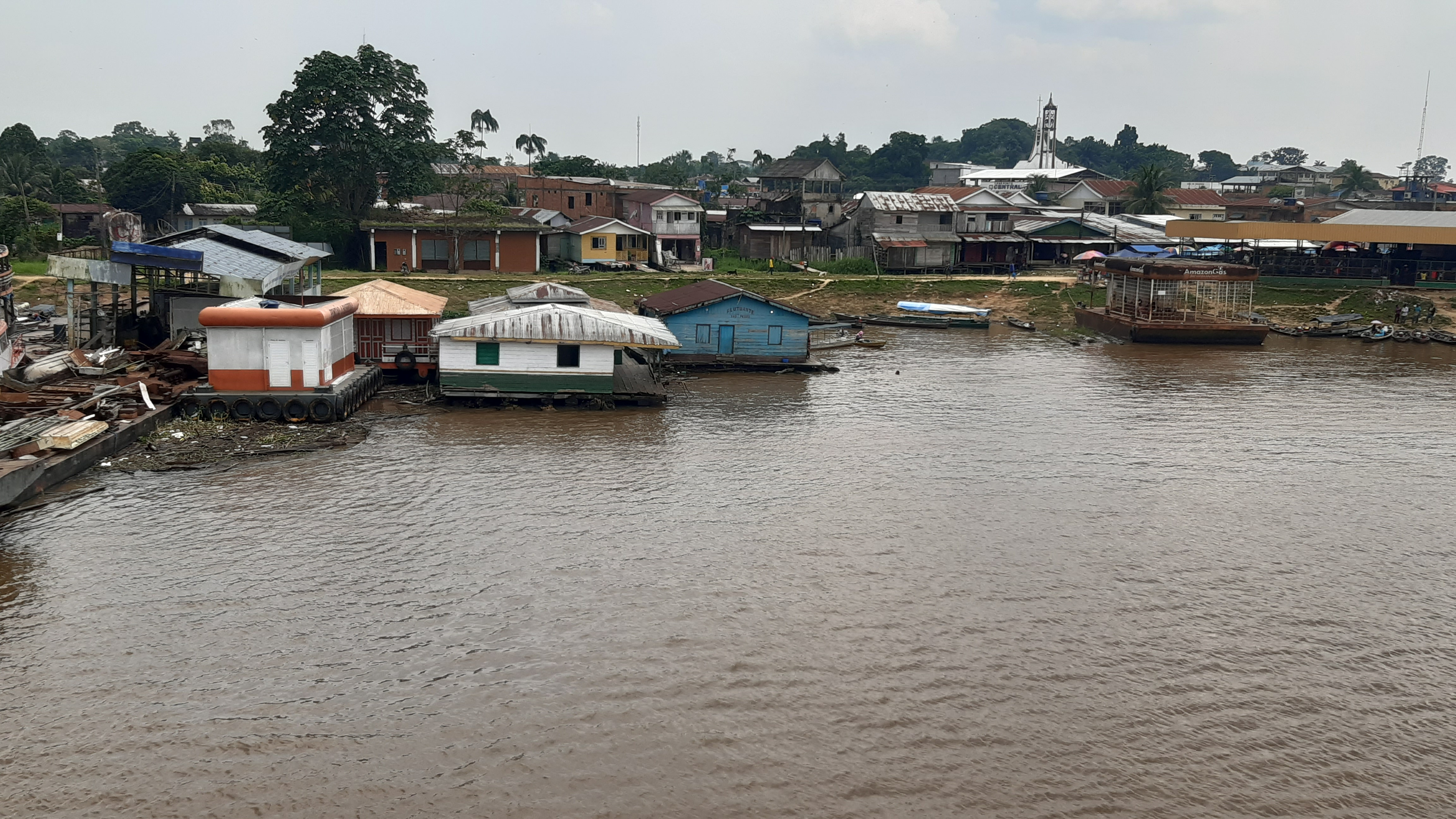
View of the town from the F/B Vitória Régia boat on the Javary River

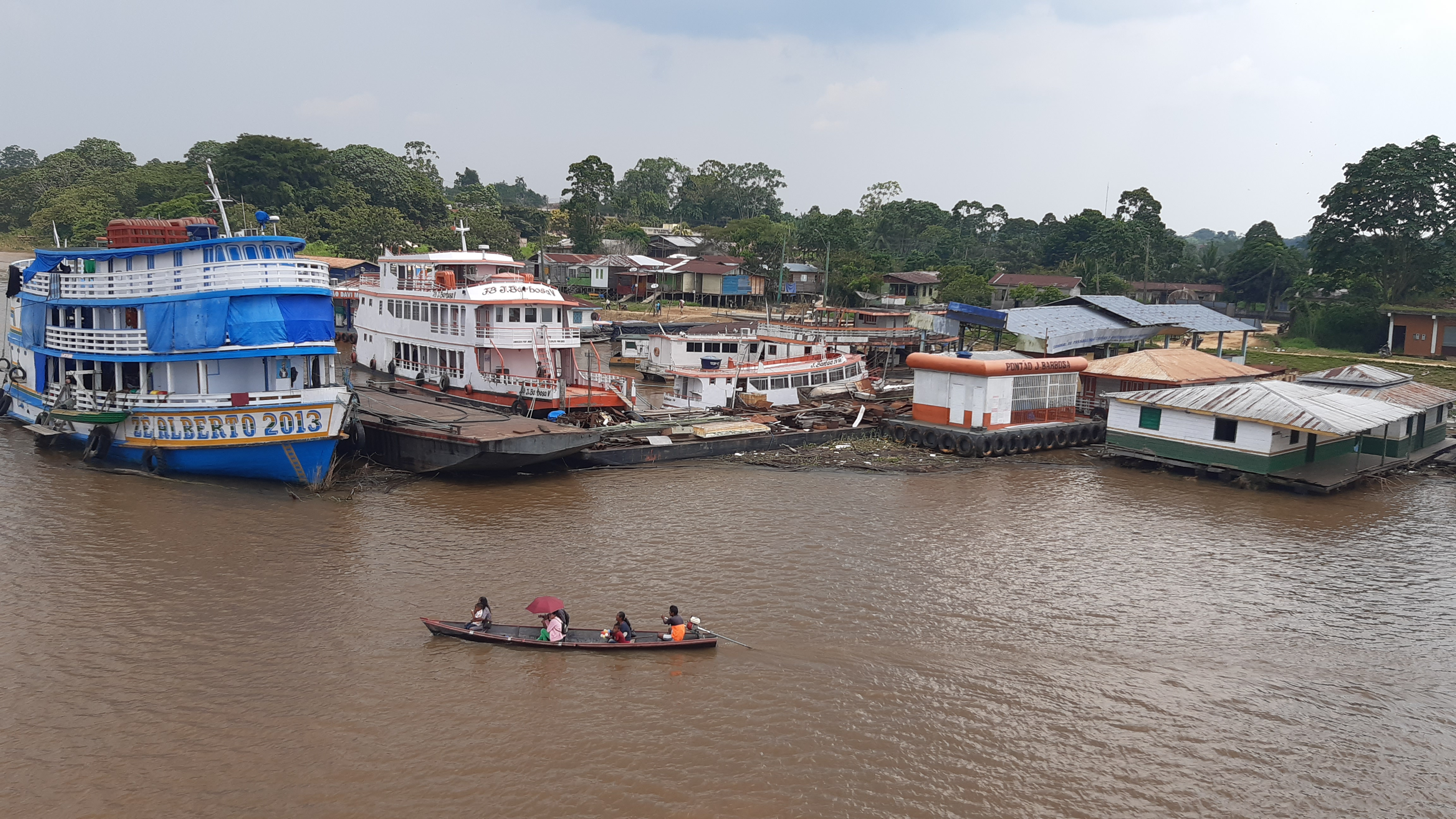
View of the town from the river

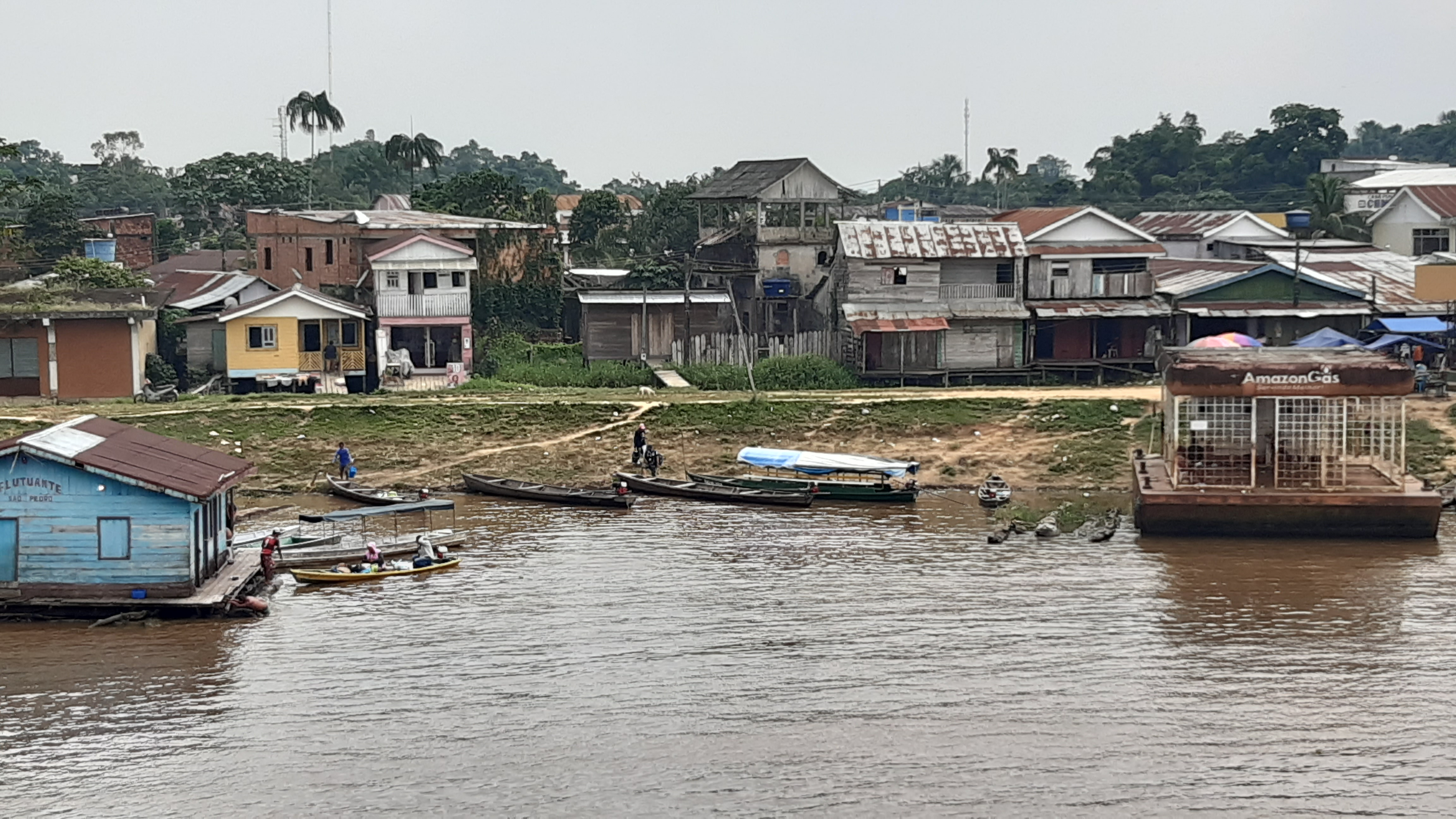
View of the town from the river

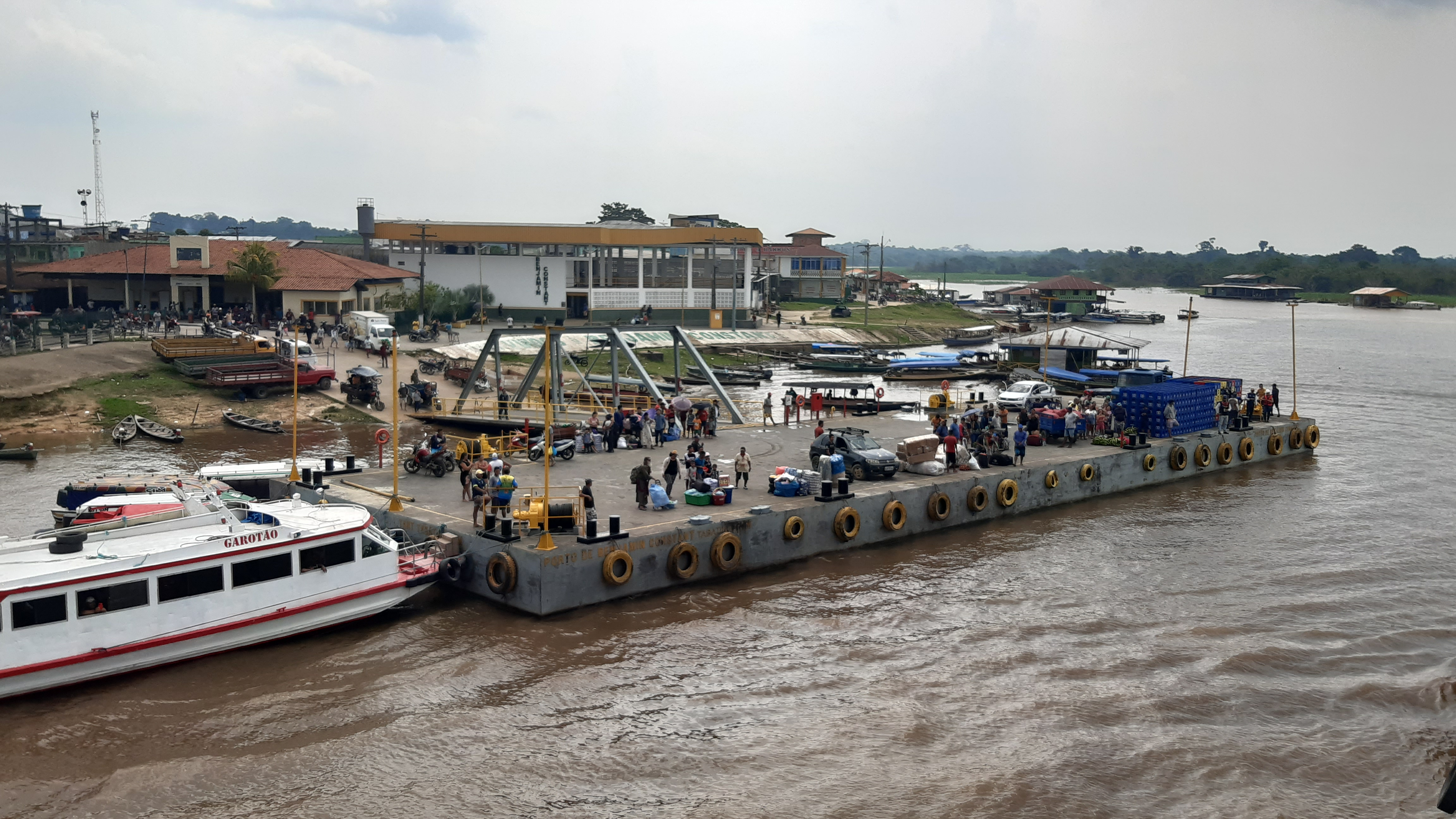
View of Benjamin Constant port from the river

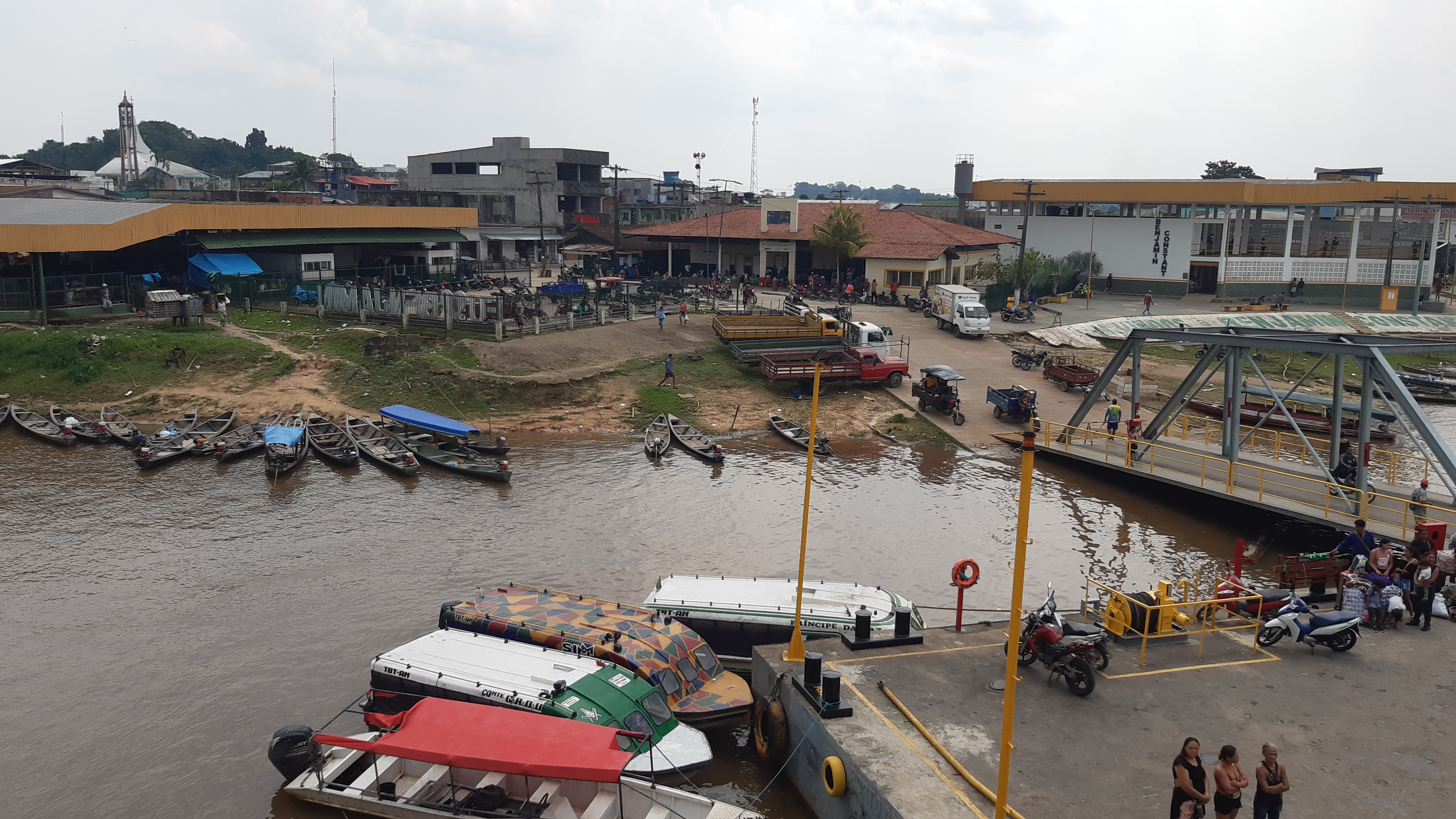
View of Benjamin Constant port from the river
