= Ramón Castilla District =

Coordinates: 3.9100°S 70.5250°W

Ramón Castilla
- District
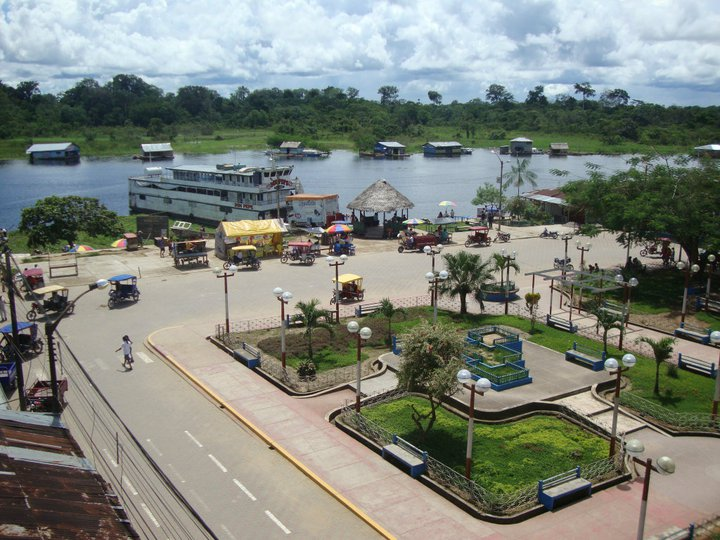
- Caballococha
- Interactive map of Ramón Castilla
- Country: Peru
- Region: Loreto
- Province: Mariscal Ramón Castilla
- Founded: July 2, 1943
- Capital: Caballococha

Area
  - Total: 7,122.78 km^{2} (2,750.12 sq mi)
- Elevation: 84 m (276 ft)

Population (2005 census)
  - Total: 18,146
  - Density: 2.5476/km^{2} (6.5983/sq mi)
- Time zone: UTC-5 (PET)
- UBIGEO: 160401

Ramón Castilla District is one of four districts of the province Mariscal Ramón Castilla in Peru. The district was named after Ramón Castilla.

== Climate ==
Climate data for Caballococha, Ramón Castilla, elevation 75 m (246 ft), (1991–2020)
Month	Jan	Feb	Mar	Apr	May	Jun	Jul	Aug	Sep	Oct	Nov	Dec	Year
Mean daily maximum °C (°F)	31.8 (89.2)	31.8 (89.2)	31.9 (89.4)	31.9 (89.4)	31.4 (88.5)	31.2 (88.2)	31.3 (88.3)	32.3 (90.1)	33.0 (91.4)	32.7 (90.9)	32.8 (91.0)	32.0 (89.6)	32.0 (89.6)
Mean daily minimum °C (°F)	23.0 (73.4)	23.1 (73.6)	23.0 (73.4)	23.2 (73.8)	23.0 (73.4)	22.4 (72.3)	22.0 (71.6)	22.2 (72.0)	22.6 (72.7)	23.0 (73.4)	23.2 (73.8)	23.2 (73.8)	22.8 (73.1)
Average precipitation mm (inches)	298.9 (11.77)	297.8 (11.72)	348.3 (13.71)	358.1 (14.10)	238.4 (9.39)	172.1 (6.78)	148.0 (5.83)	110.6 (4.35)	115.9 (4.56)	219.6 (8.65)	222.1 (8.74)	283.4 (11.16)	2,813.2 (110.76)
Source: National Meteorology and Hydrology Service of Peru
