= Tabatinga =

Municipality of Amazonas, Brazil

- Municipality
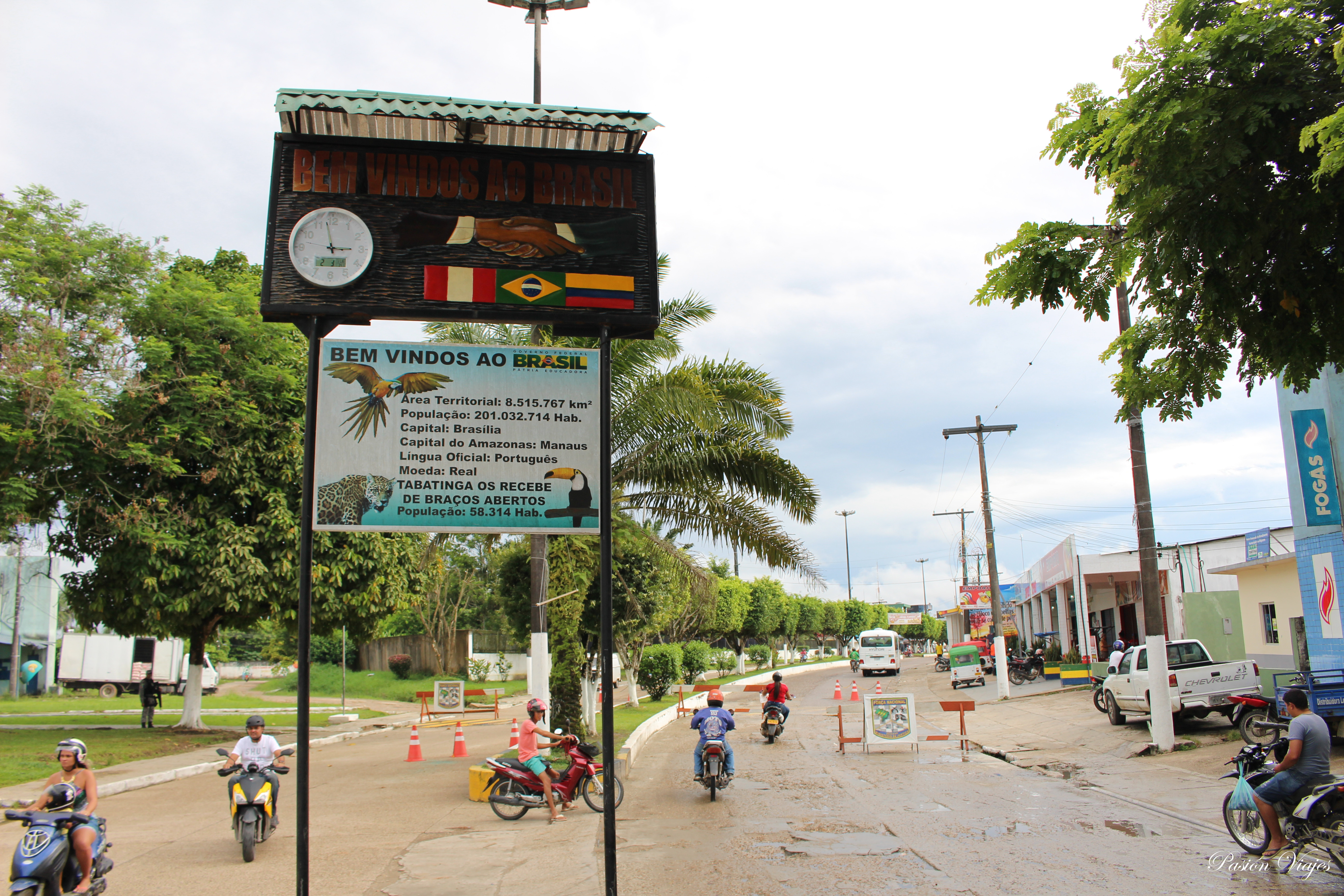

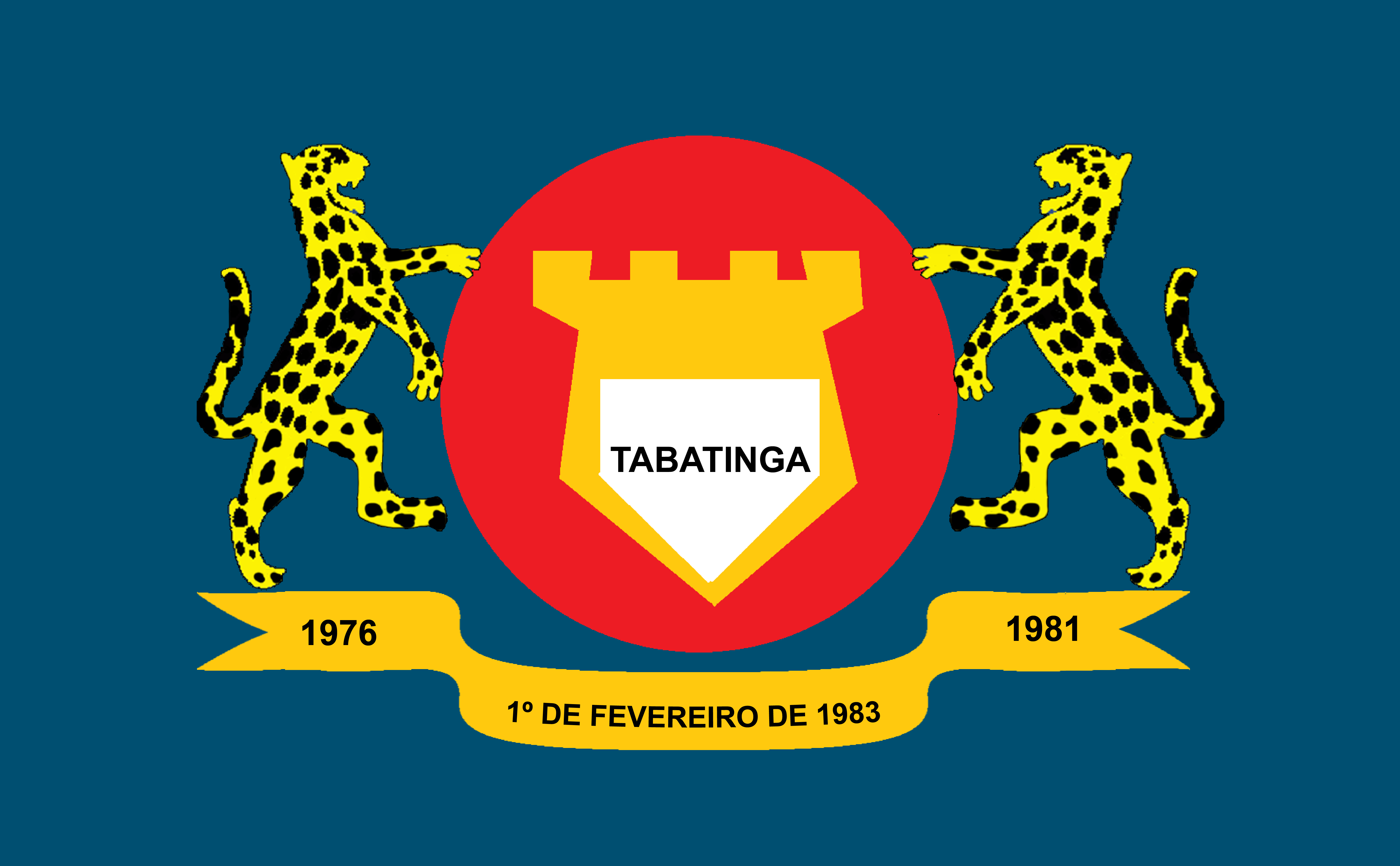
- Flag

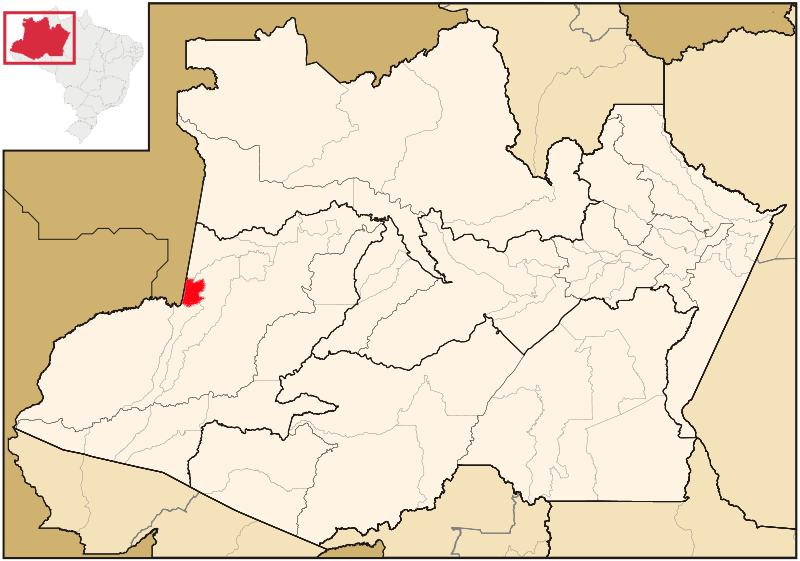
- Location of the municipality inside Amazonas

- Location in Brazil
- Coordinates: 4°15′9″S 69°56′17″W
- Country: Brazil
- Region: North
- State: Amazonas
- Founded: July 28, 1866 (Limits committee - Department of state of the Brazil); February 1, 1983 (Official foundation)

Government
  - Mayor: Saul Nunes Bemerguy (Social Democratic Party)

Area
  - Total: 3,225.064 km^{2} (1,245.204 sq mi)
- Elevation: 60 m (200 ft)

Population (2020)
  - Total: 67,182
- Time zone: UTC−5 (ACT)

Tabatinga, originally Forte de São Francisco Xavier de Tabatinga, is a municipality in the Três Fronteiras area of Western Amazonas. It is in the Brazilian state of Amazonas. Its population was 67,182 (2020) and its area is 3,225 km^{2}.

Together with the neighbouring Colombian city of Leticia and the Peruvian city of Santa Rosa de Yavari, the urban area has more than 100,000 residents spread along the Amazon River. The first Portuguese settlement in the area was founded in the 18th century as a military outpost. It became an autonomous municipality on February 1, 1983. Formerly, it was part of the municipality of Benjamin Constant. The city is the seat of the Roman Catholic Diocese of Alto Solimões. Tabatinga is the closest Brazilian city to Ecuador.

== Etymology ==
The word Tabatinga is of indigenous origin, coming from the Tupi tobatinga, having its meaning designated as white clay or soil white. It is believed that the indigenous people referred to the region with that name because of the white clay found abundantly at the bottom of the region's rivers. In the Tupi Guarani, the word also means small house.

== History ==
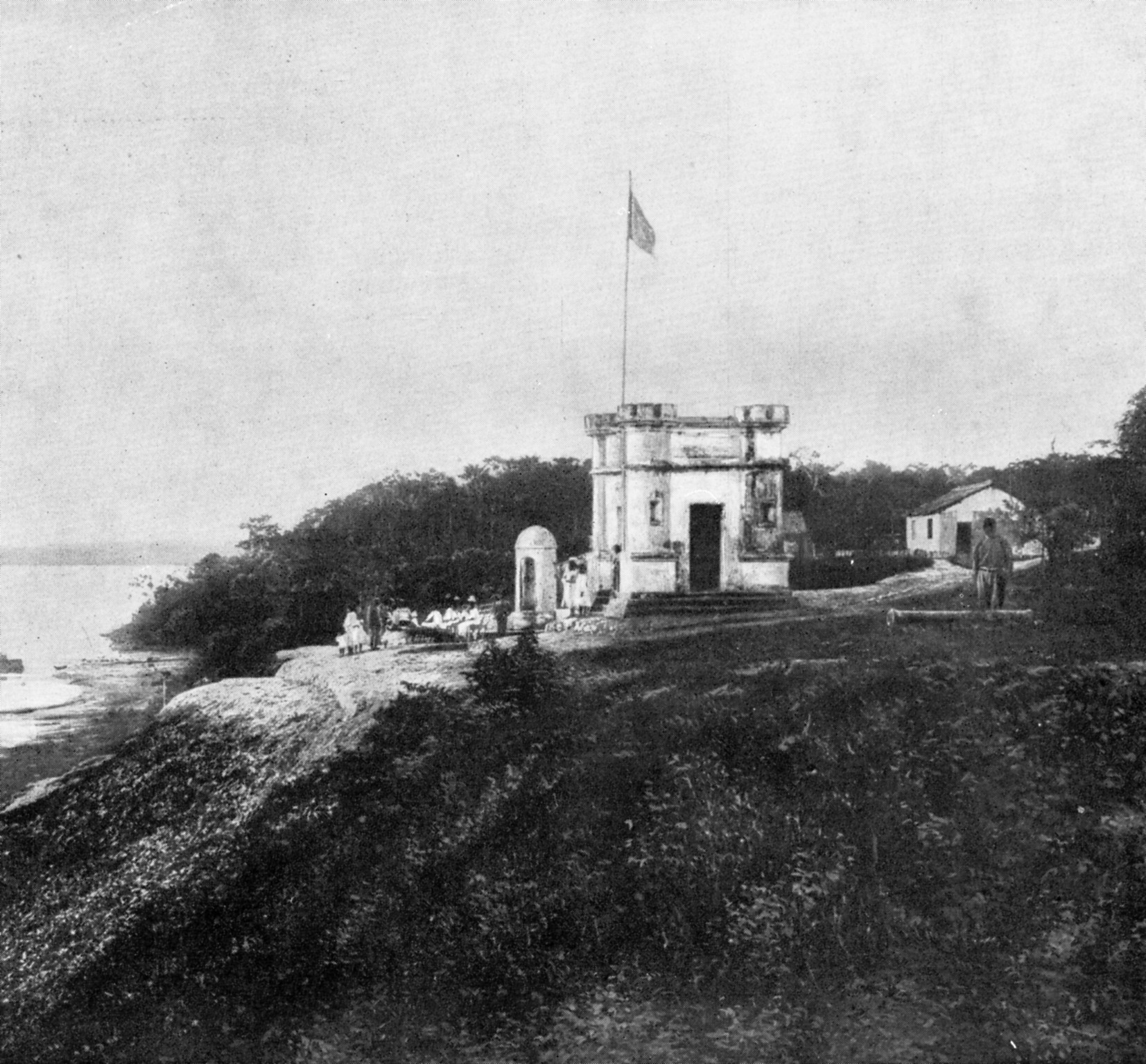
Post between the borders of Tabatinga and Leticia in 1924, Brazil and Colombia

In the middle of the 17th century, near of the Amazon River, the foundation of a village by the Jesuits was registered by the Portuguese Empire. A military post and tax office were established near the site in 1766 to become a border region with Colombia and Peru. Fernando da Costa Ataíde Teives was responsible for the creation of a military post in the region and also created a border post between the domains of the Kingdom of Portugal and Spain, alongside other military posts. The town of São Francisco Xavier de Tabatinga was then established. Of the three main colonial border settlements (São Francisco Xavier de Tabatinga, Vila Ipiranga and Vila Bittencourt), only the first was actively developing. On June 28, 1866, near the village, the border between Brazil and Peru was drawn. Until then, the region was administratively subordinated to the municipality of São Paulo de Olivença, however many few municipalities were established in the region. In 1898, with the dismantling of the territory of São Paulo de Olivença and the emancipation of the district of Benjamin Constant, the city of Tabatinga became part of the newly created municipality, including it as one of the subdivisions of the main district.

A post between the borders of Tabatinga and Leticia in 1924 consistently defined the borders between Brazil and Colombia. On 4 June 1968, under Federal Law 5.449, the entire area of the municipality of Benjamin Constant, to which Tabatinga was subordinated, was classified by the Brazilian government as a National Security Area, due to its extensive open border with other countries and its poor border surveillance. For a long time Tabatinga was a district of Benjamin Constant. Tabatinga's political emancipation occurred on December 10, 1981, under the constitutional amendment of the State of Amazonas No. 12, which now defines the Tabatinga district as an autonomous municipality. The installation of municipal offices took place on January 1, 1983.

== Demographics ==
=== Ethnic composition ===
The population of Tabatinga municipality is quite heterogeneous. It is formed by Brazilians, Peruvians, Colombians, among them indigenous people of different ethnic groups, most of whom are Tikunas and Kokamas. Among the Brazilians in Tabatinga, there is the rotating population, corresponding to the military of the armed forces, bank branch workers and people who work for public agencies of the Brazilian government, because it is a border region, a large number of federal police officers, federal revenue agents, federal prosecutors, among others, are seen. The Ticunas Indians form the largest ethnic group in Tabatinga, and the Tukuna Umariaçu indigenous reserve is found in the region of the municipality, inhabited by a majority belonging to this ethnic group. The official language of the municipality is Portuguese, but Spanish and tribal languages are understood, including Tikuna language.

According to the 2022 Census by IBGE, the city is predominantly pardo, with them making up 46% of the population.

Ethnic groups in Tabatinga, Amazonas (2022 Census)
1. Pardo (mixed) 30,735 (46.0%)
2. White 6,569 (9.84%)
3. Black 1,871 (2.80%)
4. Yellow (Asian) 69 (0.10%)
5. Indigenous 27,518 (41.2%)

Historical population
Year	Pop.	±%
1991	27,923	—
2000	37,919	+35.8%
2010	52,272	+37.9%
2022	66,764	+27.7%

== Economy ==
The city's economy is driven by a significant portion of the informal economy and subsistence agriculture. It is also made up of public sector jobs and the extensive financial exchange of the Colombian city of Leticia, which, based on dollar regulation, takes place in parallel in the city between the Colombian Peso and the Brazilian Real.

== Security ==
The extensive border with Colombia and Peru causes Tabatinga to be considered by the Federal Police and the Brazilian Army to be one of the main points of entry of cocaine into Brazil. According to Brazilian police authorities, the precarious enforcement of the law and problems of neighboring nations with illicit narcotics production make Tabatinga a frequent point of entry for drugs bound for Brazil's major cities.

== Transportation ==
The city is served by Tabatinga International Airport, and Tabatinga port where passengers can travel downriver by boat to Manaus or upriver to Iquitos, Peru.

== Consular representation ==
Colombia has a Consulate in Tabatinga.

== Gallery ==
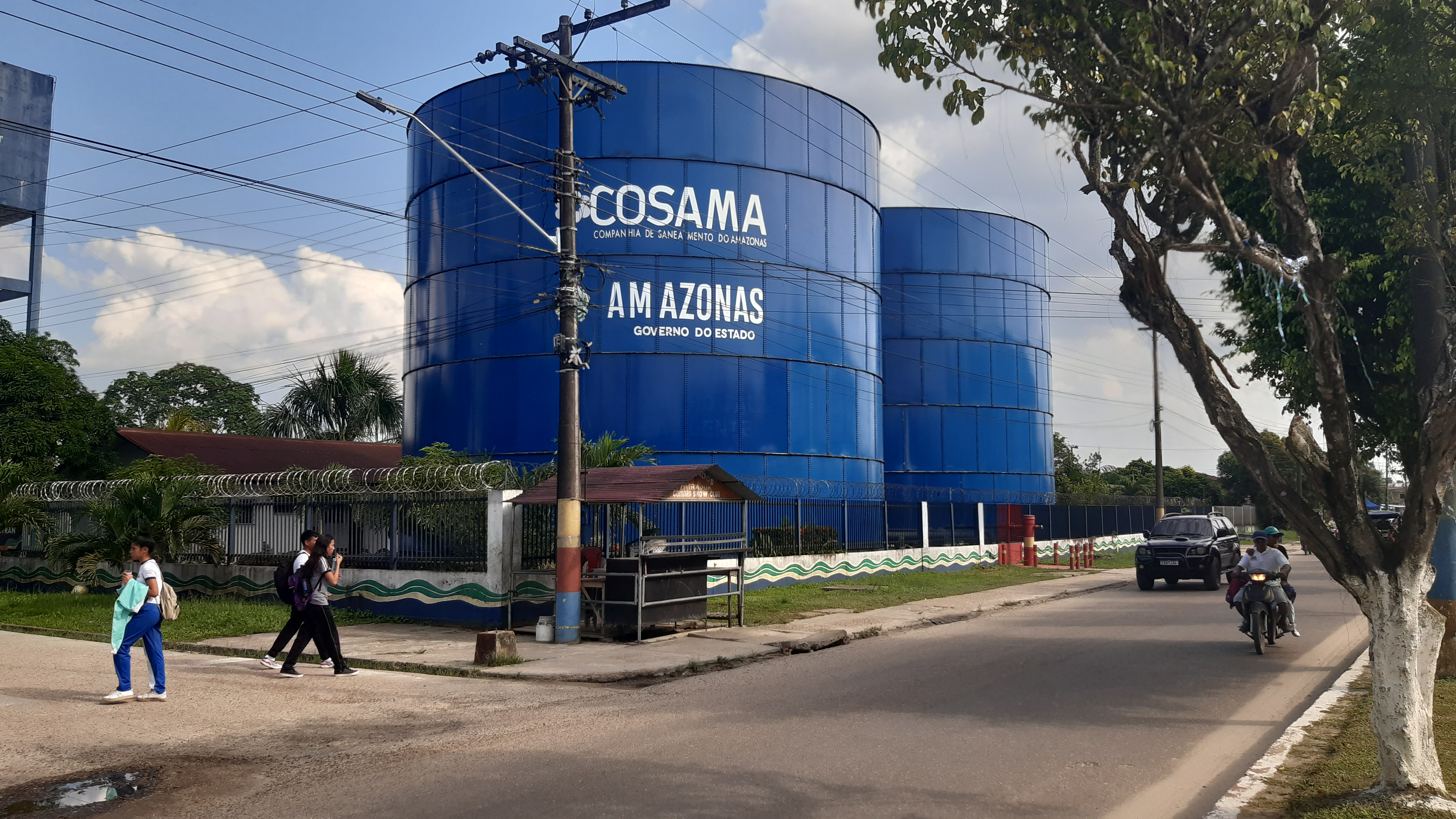
COSAMA (Companhia de Saneamento do Amazonas) operates in the collection, treatment and distribution of water in the state of Amazonas

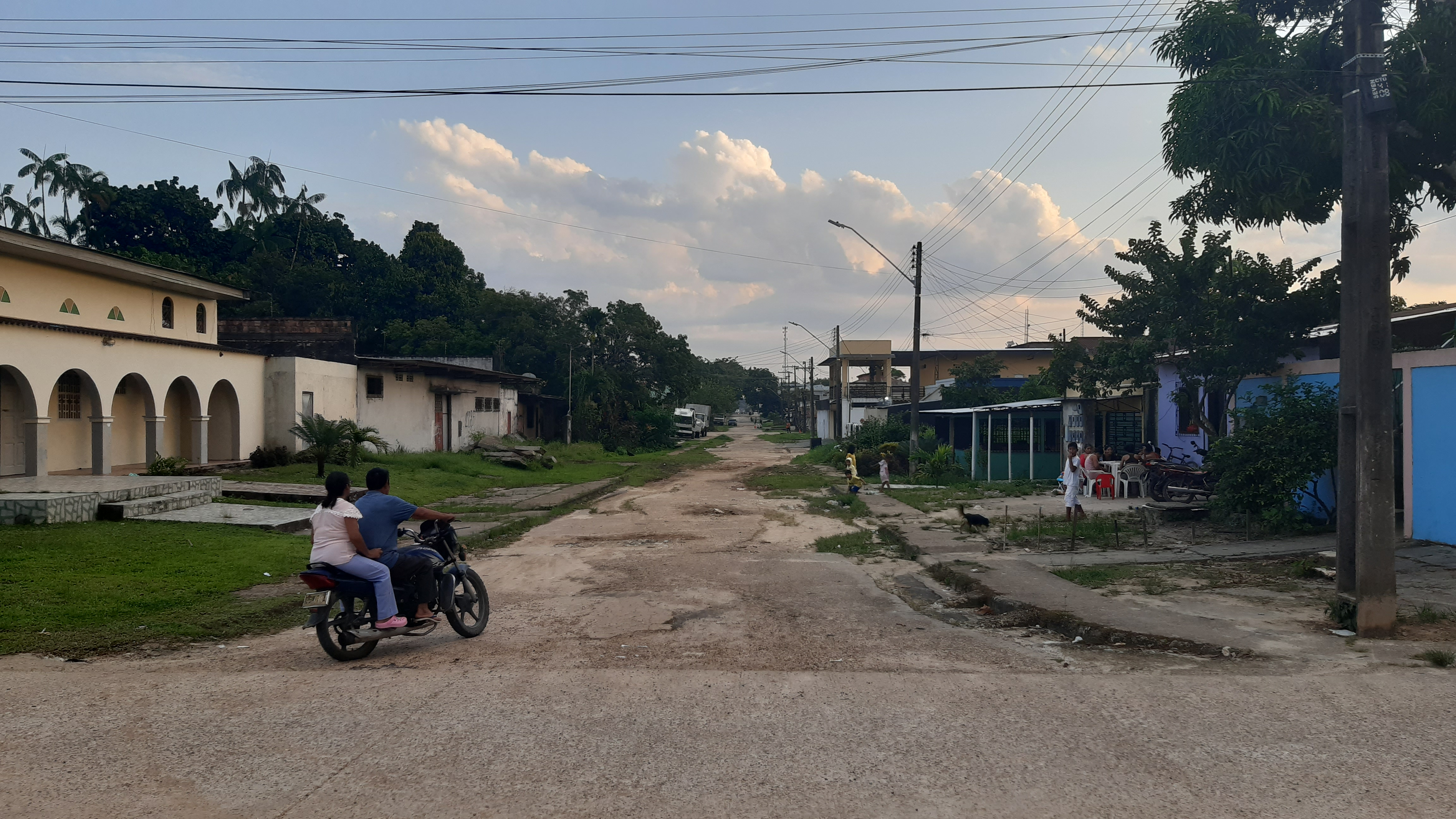
Street in Tabatinga

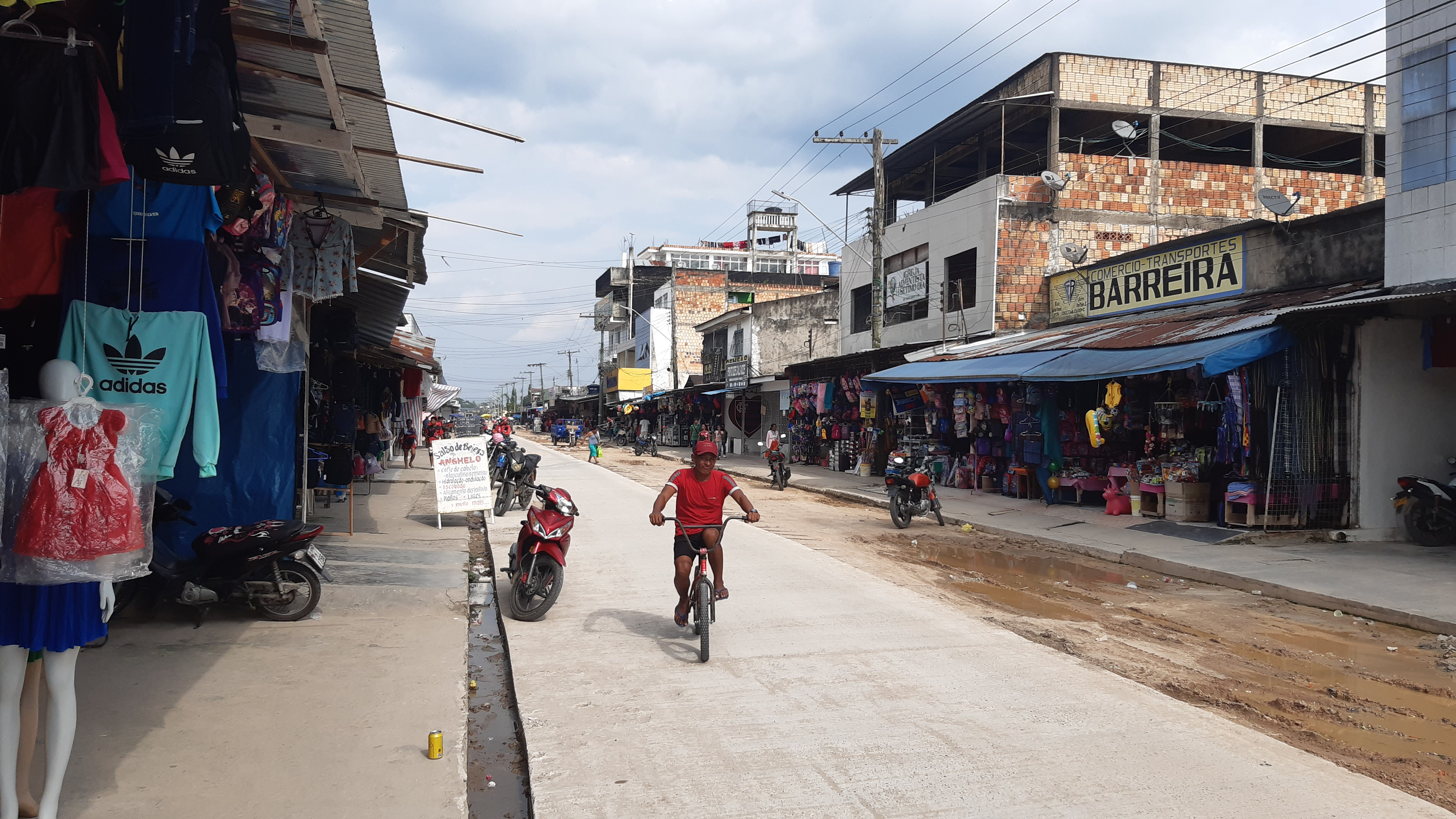
Street in Tabatinga

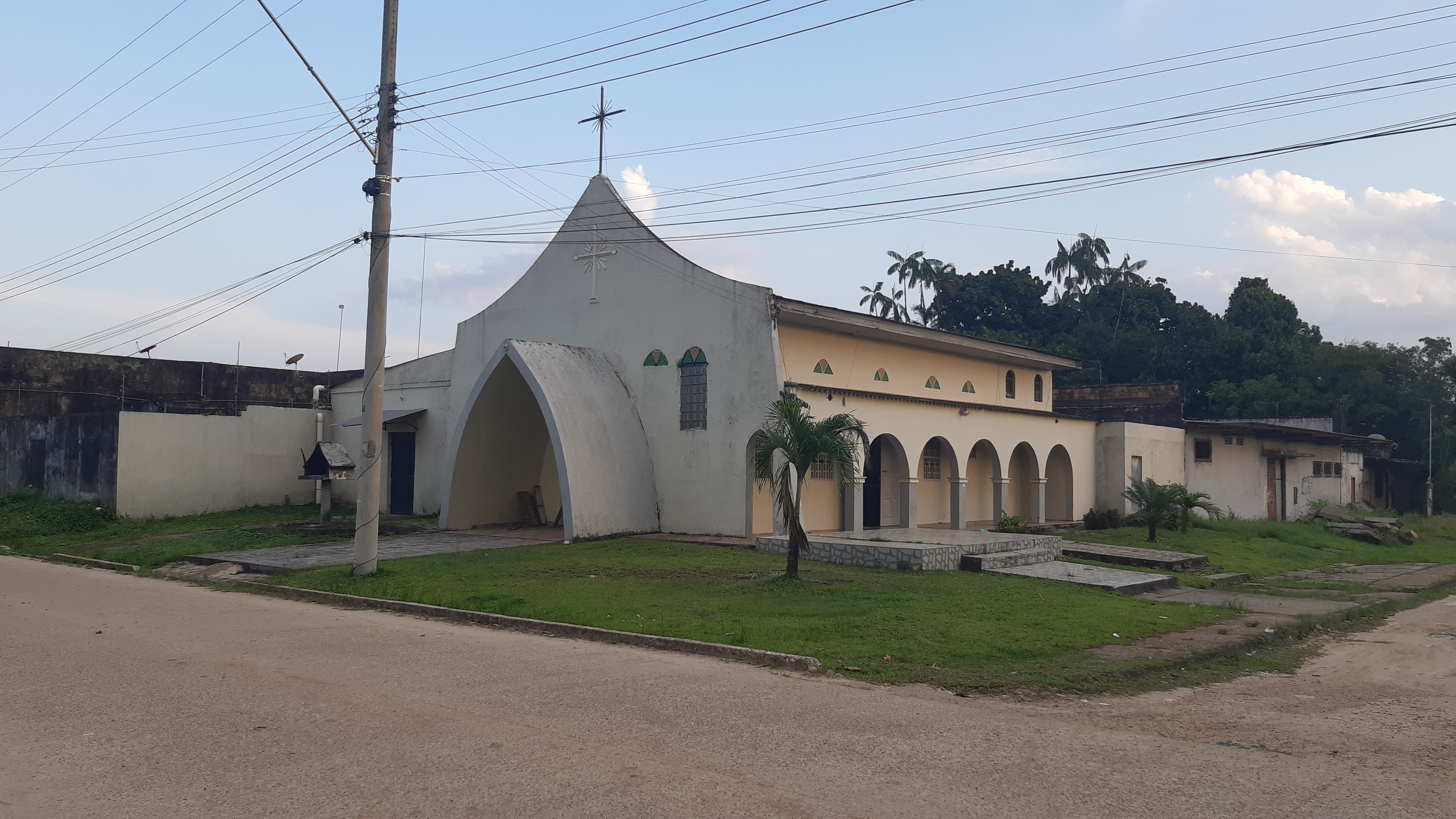
Typical church in Tabatinga

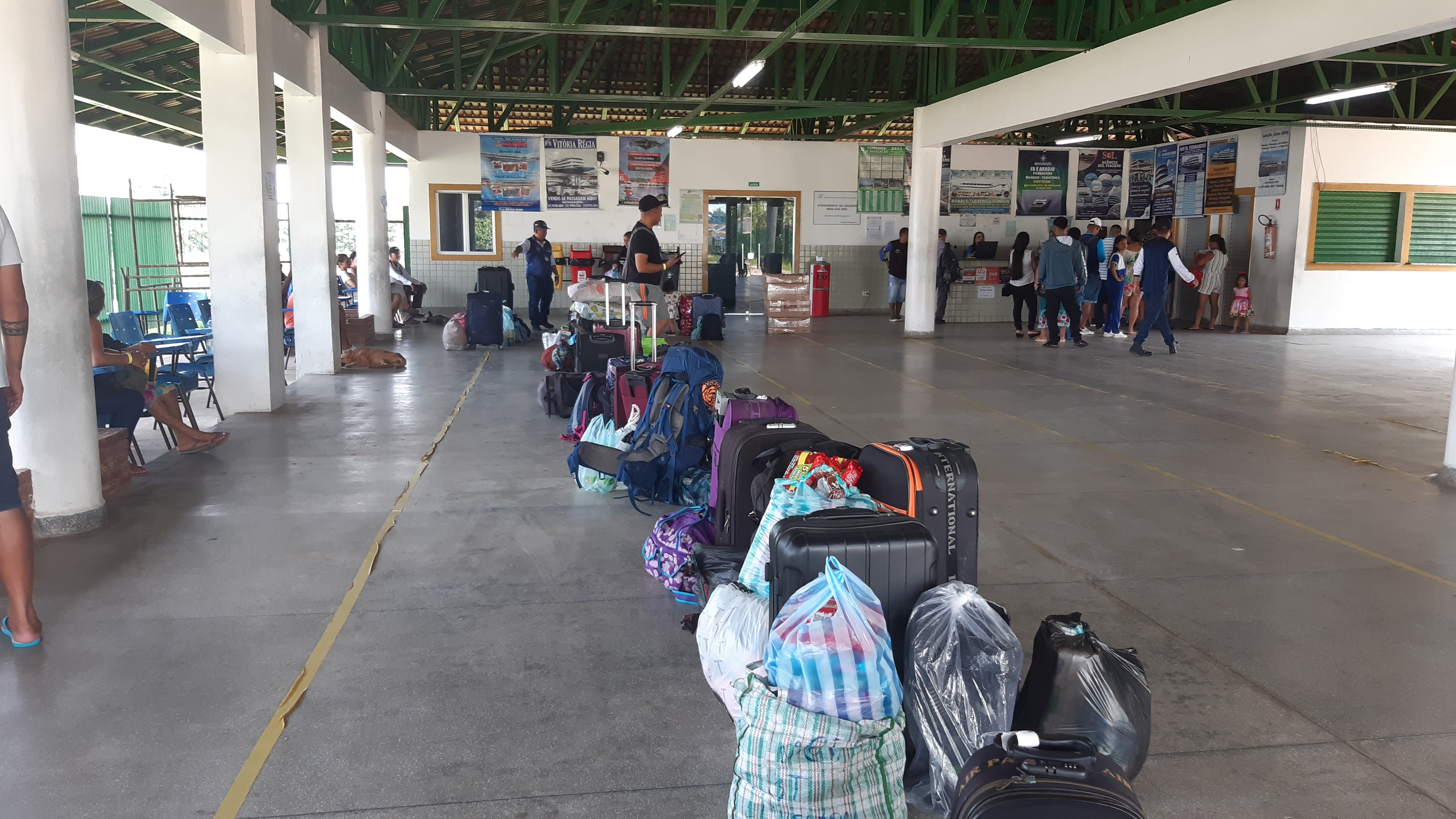
Passengers at Tabatinga port queueing for a ferry to Manaus

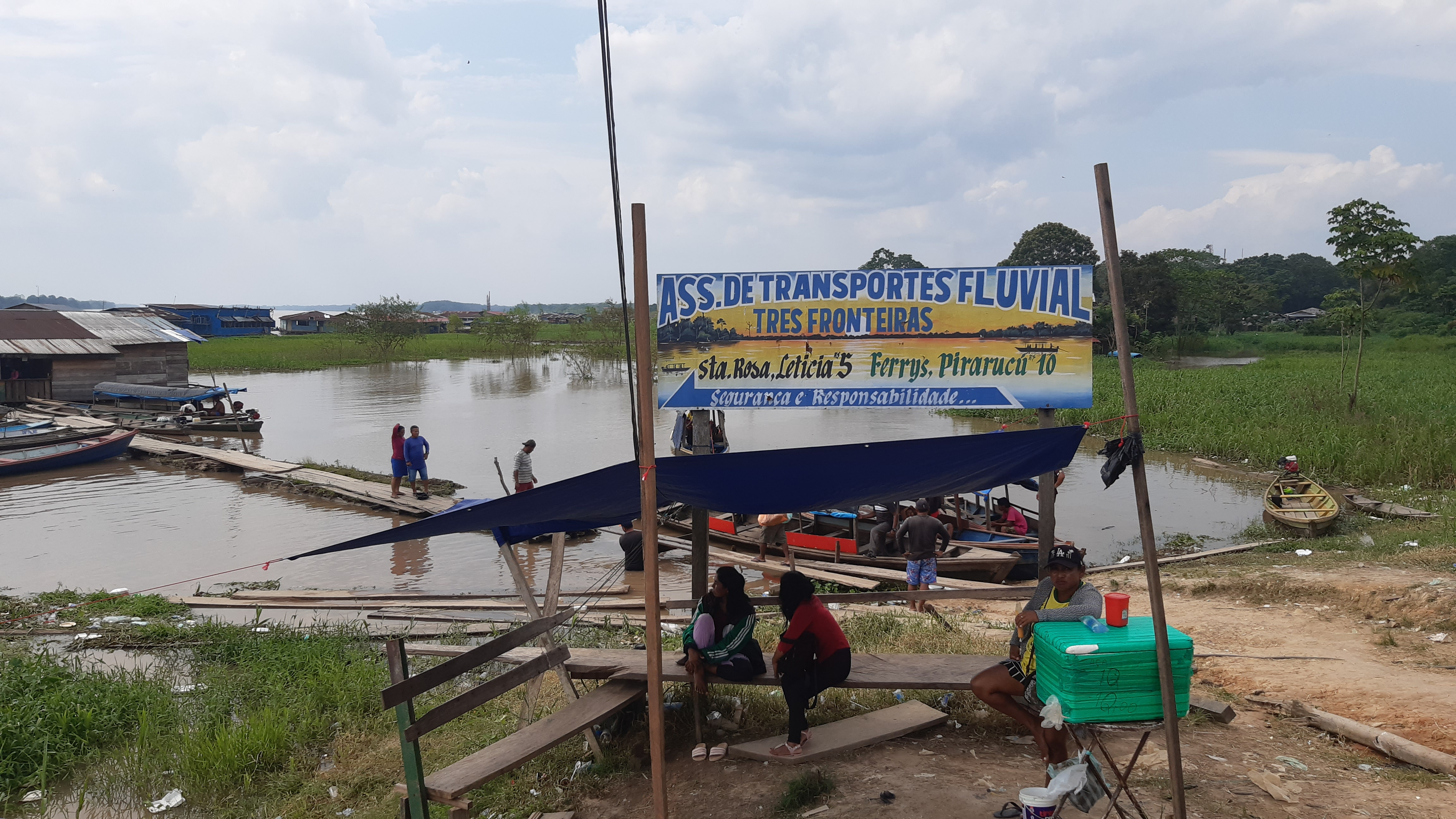
The riverside in Tabatinga

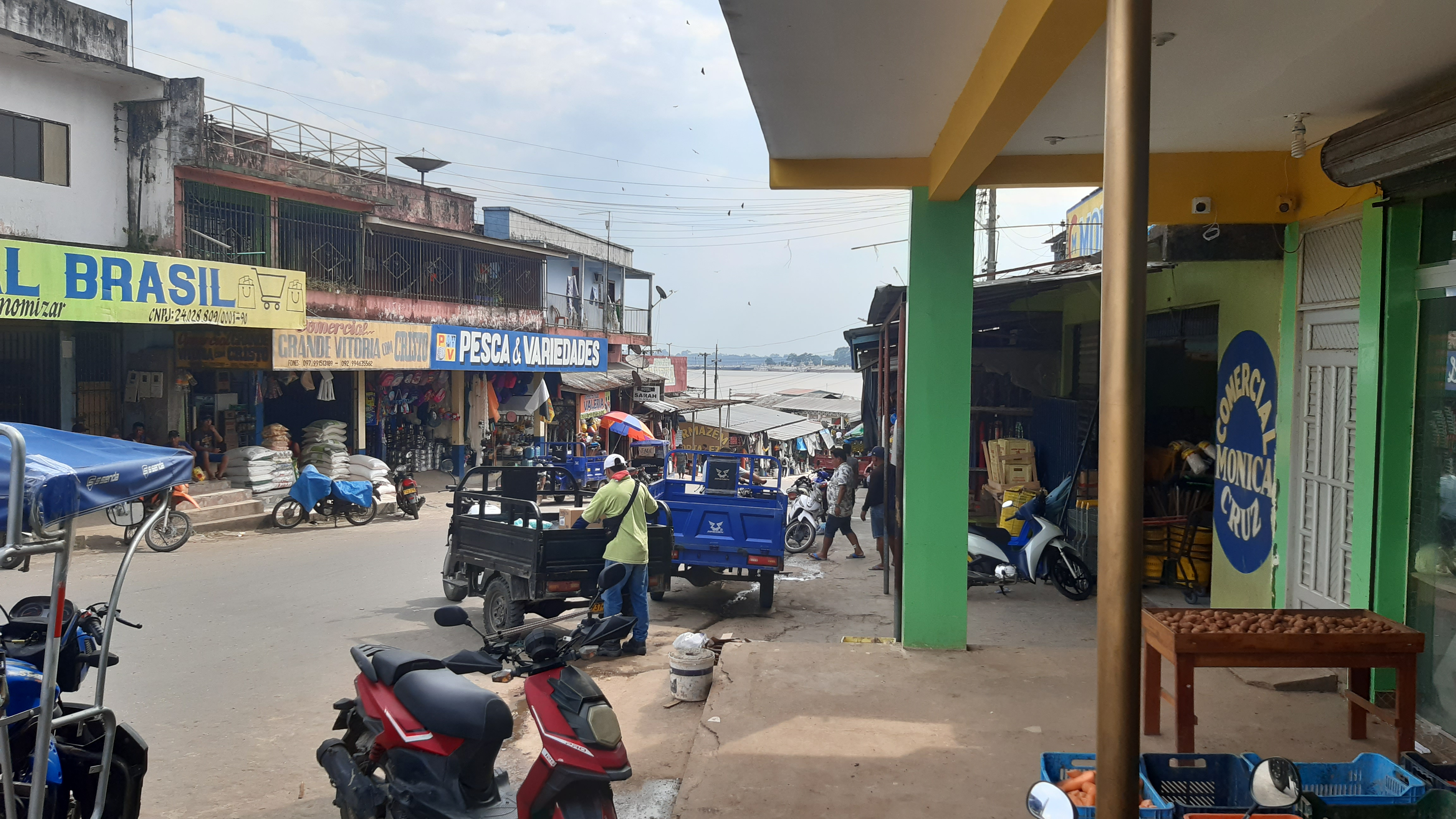
Tabatinga port

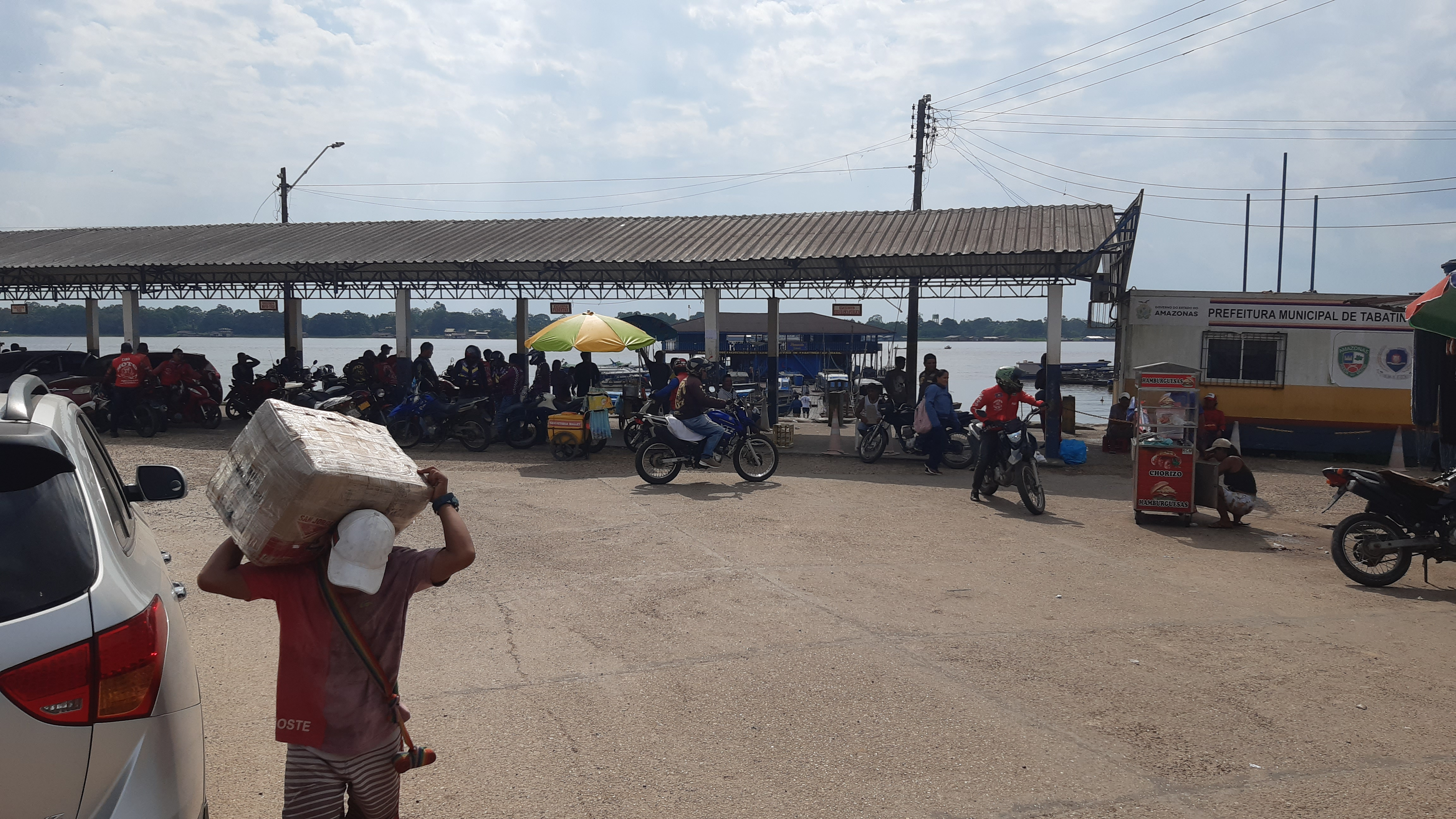
Tabatinga port

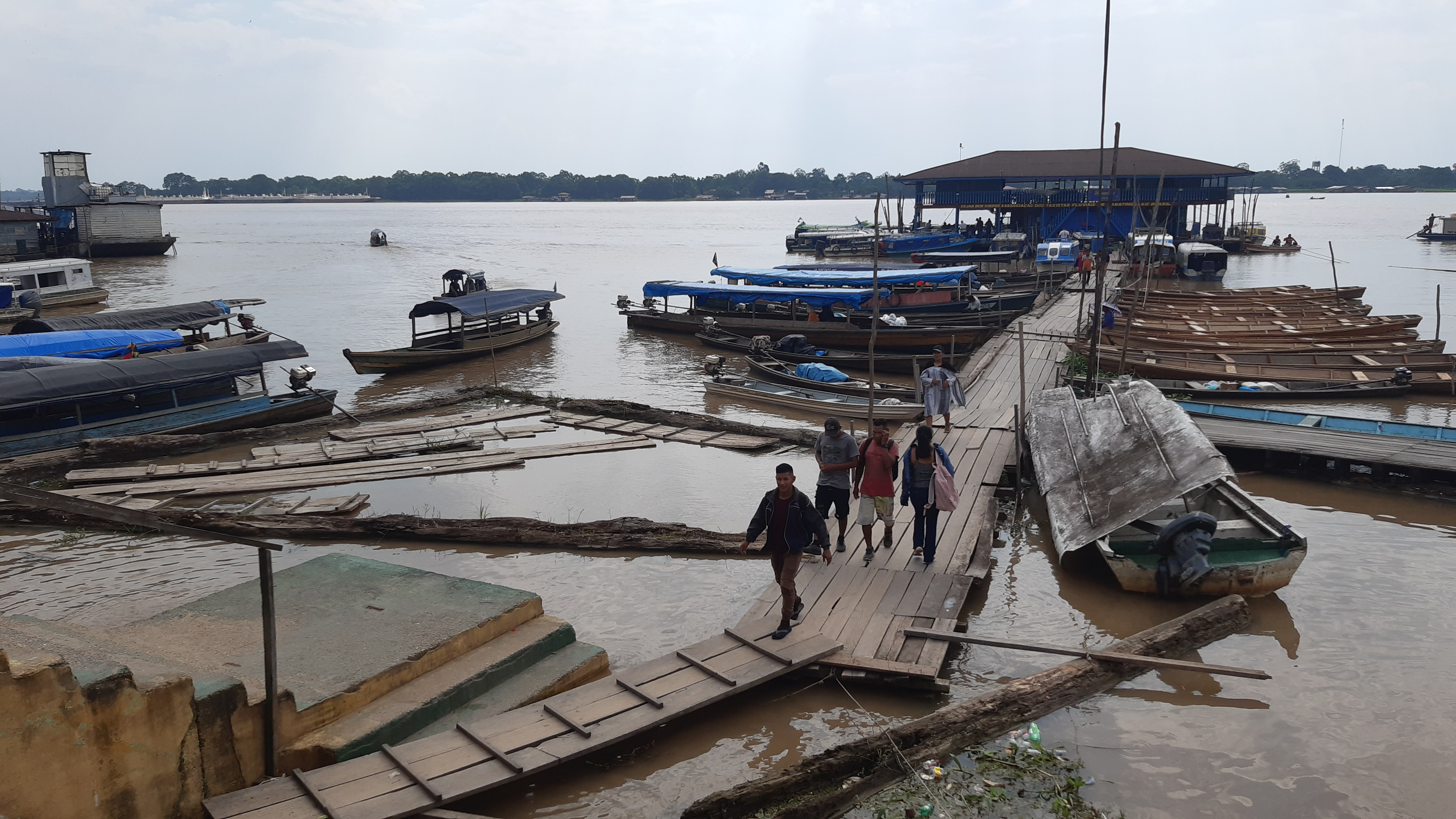
Tabatinga port
