= Santa Rosa de Yavarí =

City in Loreto, Peru

- Provincial capital
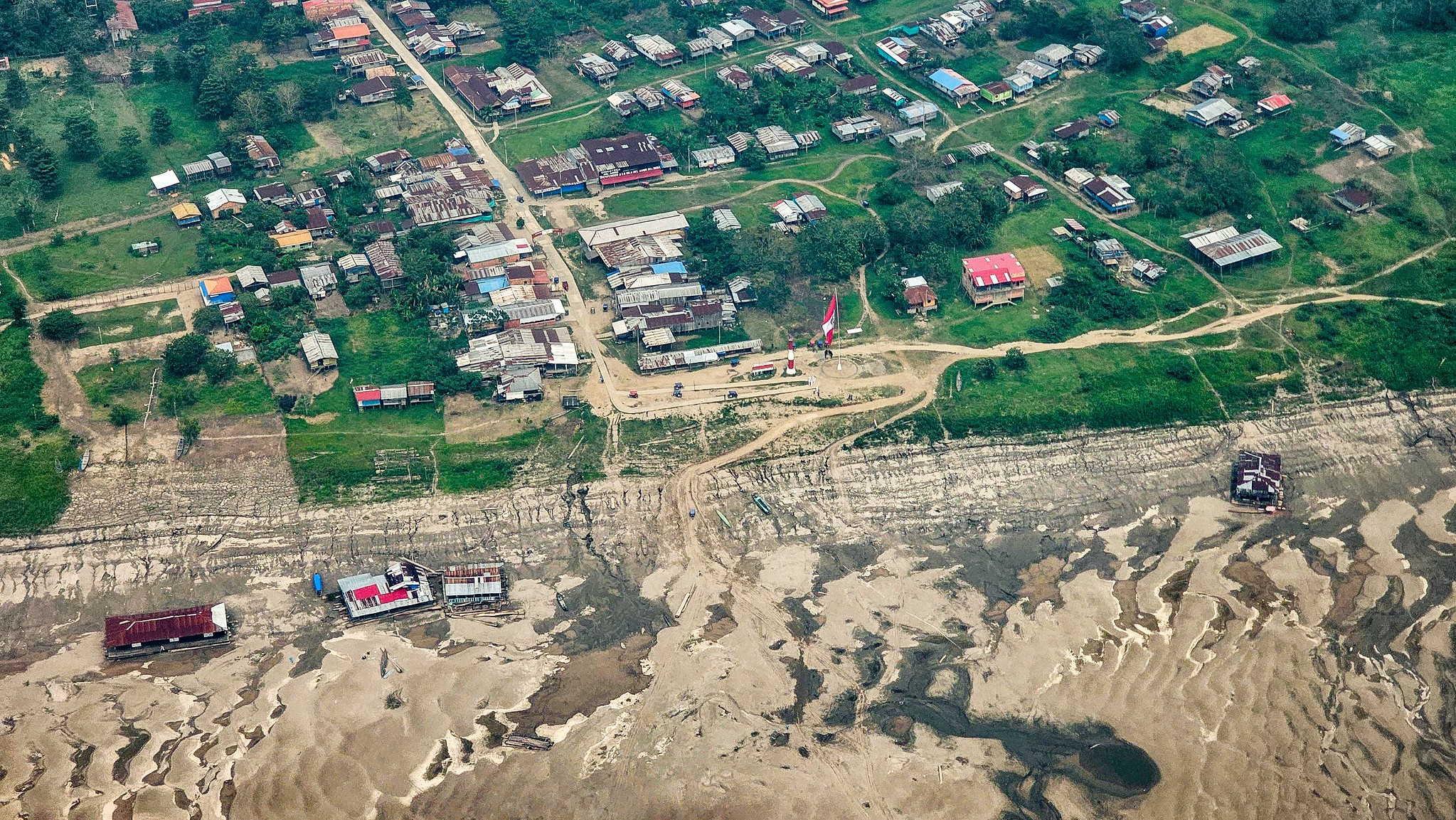

- Location of Santa Rosa
- Country: Peru
- Department: Loreto
- Province: Mariscal Ramón Castilla
- District: Santa Rosa de Loreto
- Established: August 30, 1974
- Named for: Saint Rose of Lima

Population (2017)
  - Total: 970

Santa Rosa de Yavarí is a populated centre in the Amazon River that serves as the Peruvian border crossing of Tres Fronteras, a triple border shared by Brazil, Colombia, and Peru. The city has a population of about 3,000 and is administered by Peru as part of Mariscal Ramón Castilla, a province of Loreto Region. However, it is disputed by Colombia since 2024.

== Geography ==
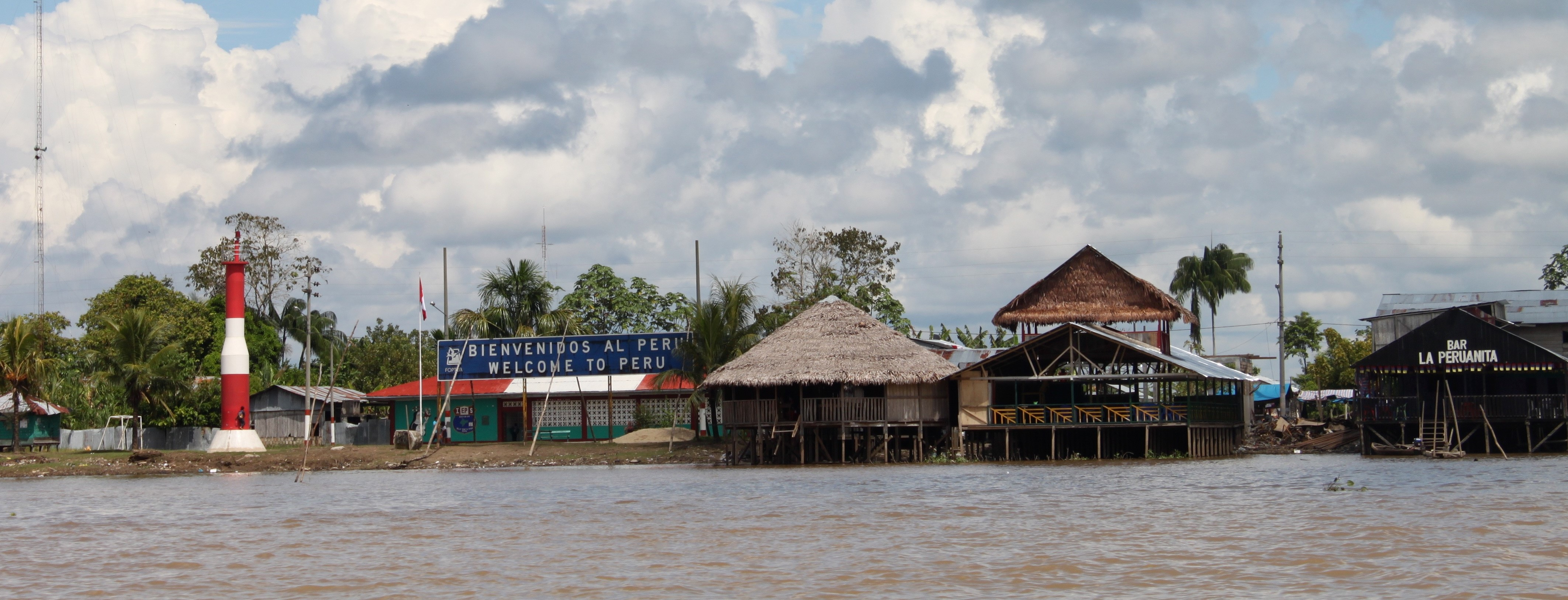
The city seen from the Amazon, with a "Welcome to Peru" sign

The city is located in Santa Rosa Island, located in the international Tres Fronteras area of the Upper Amazon region, in the western Amazon basin. The Peruvian government considers the island to be an extension of Chinería Island, which has led to a dispute with Colombia.

The cities of Leticia (Colombia) and Tabatinga (Brazil) are across from Santa Rosa on the mainland sides of the Amazon. Almost all transportation to the island is by boat as the area has no bridges due to the wideness of the river, frequent flooding, and shifting riverbanks.

The town serves as a checkpoint and crossing point for the two international borders that join that of Peru in the area. Much of the local economy relies on trade along and across the river. Tourism and fishing are major activities.

== History ==
The settlement was established on August 30, 1974, by Aladino Cevallos, Arturo Ahuanari Amias, Guillermo Velásquez, Daniel Pérez, José Bardales, and Santiago Jaramillo, Peruvian citizens from Mariscal Ramón Castilla province. The inauguration was attended by Juan, Antonio y Francisco Pisco, Manuel Bernandino Souza, Lucas Ferreira, Guillermo Ferreira and Pedro Laurente Ferreira, local Brazilians who acted as witnesses to the event.

== See also ==
- Loreto Region, Peru
- Upper Amazon region
