= Mariscal Ramón Castilla province =

Province in Loreto, Peru

Coordinates: 3°54′21″S 70°30′59″W

Mariscal Ramón Castilla
- Province
- Location of Mariscal Ramón Castilla in Loreto
- Country: Peru
- Region: Loreto
- Founded: October 18, 1979
- Capital: Caballococha

Government
  - Mayor: Julio César Kahn Noriega

Area
  - Total: 37,412.94 km^{2} (14,445.22 sq mi)
- Elevation: 84 m (276 ft)

Population
  - Total: 55,294
  - Density: 1.4779/km^{2} (3.8278/sq mi)
- UBIGEO: 1604

Mariscal Ramón Castilla (Spanish for Marshal Ramón Castilla) is one of the eight provinces in the Loreto Region of Peru. It was created by Law No. 22728 on October 18, 1979, by President Francisco Morales Bermúdez. The province was named after Ramón Castilla.

Its territory is mostly flat and covered by the Amazon rainforest.

== Politics ==
=== List of mayors ===
Since 2023, the incumbent mayor is Julio César Kahn Noriega.

Mayor	Party	Term	
Mayor	Party	Begin	End
Rodolfo Díaz Soto	FREPAP	2019	2022
Julio César Kahn Noriega	—N/a	2023	2026

=== Subdivisions ===
The province is divided into five districts.

- Pebas (Pebas)
- Ramón Castilla (Caballococha)
- San Pablo (San Pablo de Loreto)
- Santa Rosa de Loreto (Santa Rosa de Yavarí)
- Yavari (Amelia)

== See also ==
- Department of Loreto
- Provinces of Peru
