= Caballococha =

City in Peru

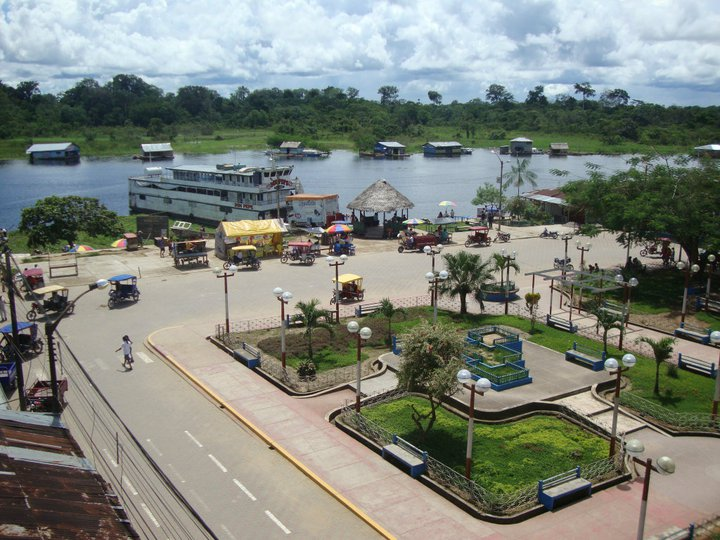
- Main square
- Nicknames: Centinela de la frontera (Sentinel of the border), Ciudad mediterránea (Mediterranean city)
- Location within Peru
- Country: Peru
- Department: Loreto
- Province: Mariscal Ramón Castilla
- District: Ramón Castilla
- Founded: 1845

Population (2014)
  - Total: 25,000
- Demonym(s): Caballocochano, -na
- Time zone: UTC-5 (PET)

Caballococha (Cabalo Cocha) is a town in the Loreto Region in northeastern Peru, located on the Amazon River and right across the river from Colombia.

It is the capital of both Mariscal Ramón Castilla Province and Ramón Castilla District. As of 1993, it had a population of 4,028 (1993).

The name of the town is a combination of Spanish and Quechua, meaning "Horse Lake", a nearby body of water. It is a poor town and people live by farming, trading, and fishing. Television has arrived as has the internet and there is even an internet cafe in the market square.

The town saw itself participating in the Leticia Incident, an event which led to war between Peru and Colombia in 1932. Today a statue exists in the main square dedicated to the soldiers who had to carry ammo and equipment through the jungle during the war.

== Climate ==
Climate data for Caballococha, elevation 75 m (246 ft), (1991–2020)
Month	Jan	Feb	Mar	Apr	May	Jun	Jul	Aug	Sep	Oct	Nov	Dec	Year
Mean daily maximum °C (°F)	31.8 (89.2)	31.8 (89.2)	31.9 (89.4)	31.9 (89.4)	31.4 (88.5)	31.2 (88.2)	31.3 (88.3)	32.3 (90.1)	33.0 (91.4)	32.7 (90.9)	32.8 (91.0)	32.0 (89.6)	32.0 (89.6)
Mean daily minimum °C (°F)	23.0 (73.4)	23.1 (73.6)	23.0 (73.4)	23.2 (73.8)	23.0 (73.4)	22.4 (72.3)	22.0 (71.6)	22.2 (72.0)	22.6 (72.7)	23.0 (73.4)	23.2 (73.8)	23.2 (73.8)	22.8 (73.1)
Average precipitation mm (inches)	298.9 (11.77)	297.8 (11.72)	348.3 (13.71)	358.1 (14.10)	238.4 (9.39)	172.1 (6.78)	148.0 (5.83)	110.6 (4.35)	115.9 (4.56)	219.6 (8.65)	222.1 (8.74)	283.4 (11.16)	2,813.2 (110.76)
Source: National Meteorology and Hydrology Service of Peru
