= Yavari District =

Coordinates: 4.3520°S 70.0413°W

Yavari
- District
- The district municipality of Yavarí in the center of the town of Islandia, Peru
- Interactive map of Yavari
- Country: Peru
- Region: Loreto
- Province: Mariscal Ramón Castilla
- Founded: July 2, 1943
- Capital: Amelia

Area
  - Total: 13,807.5 km^{2} (5,331.1 sq mi)
- Elevation: 70 m (230 ft)

Population (2005 census)
  - Total: 9,843
  - Density: 0.7129/km^{2} (1.846/sq mi)
- Time zone: UTC-5 (PET)
- UBIGEO: 160403

Yavari District is one of four districts of the province Mariscal Ramón Castilla in Peru.
