= Tres Fronteras =

Tripoint of Brazil, Peru, and Colombia

Coordinates: 4°13′37″S 69°56′50″W

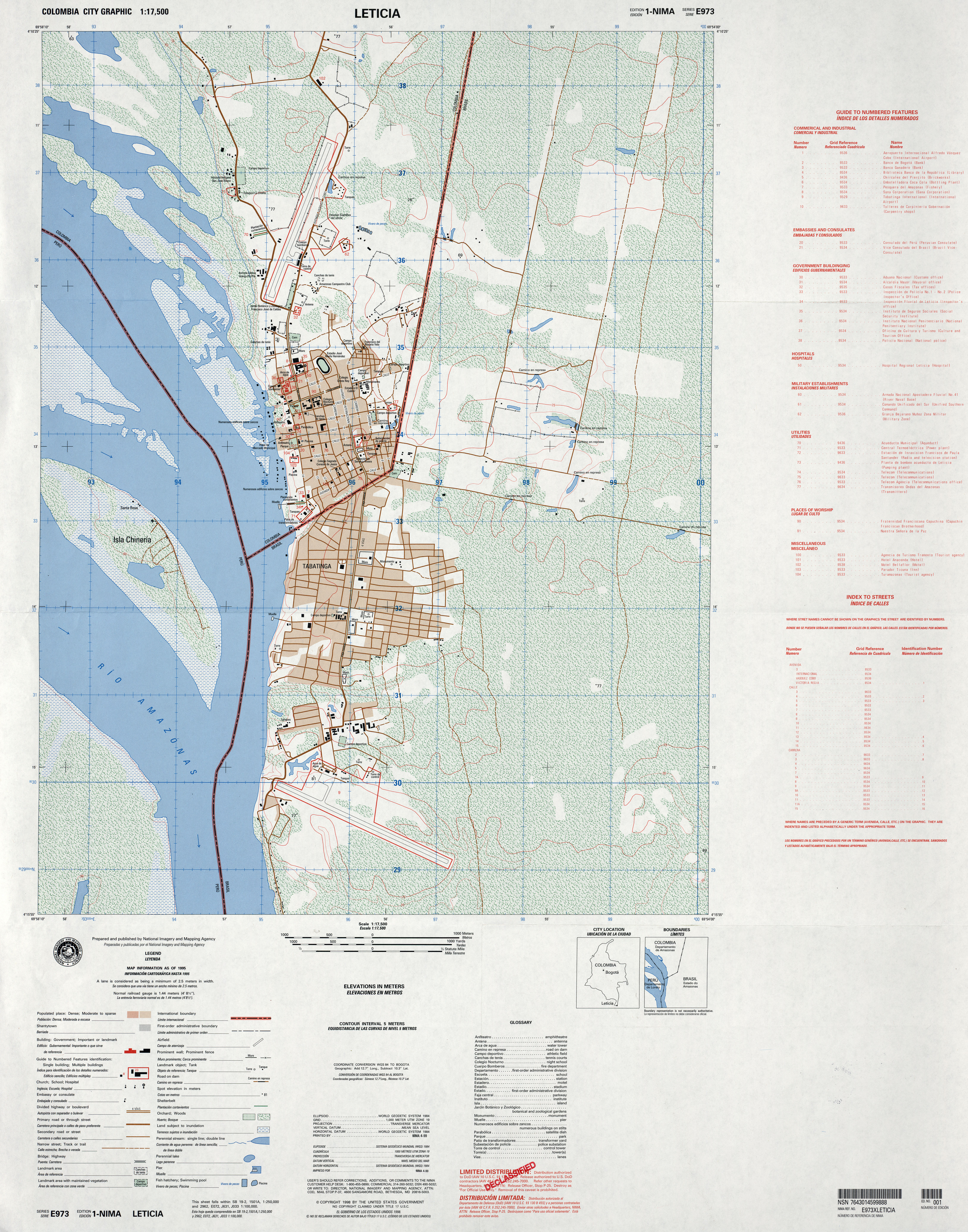
Map of the Tres Fronteras produced by the National Imagery and Mapping Agency.

Tres Fronteras (Portuguese: Três Fronteiras, English: "Three Borders") is an area of the Amazon rainforest in the Upper Amazon region of South America. It includes and is named after the tripoint at which the borders of Brazil, Peru, and Colombia meet. The upper Amazon River flows through the area.

== Geography ==
The area is noted for its natural beauty. Cities in Tres Fronteras include Tabatinga (in Brazil), Leticia (in Colombia), and Santa Rosa de Yavari (in Peru) on an island in the Amazon River.

Much of the land is within the Alto Rio Negro reserve.

== Population ==
According to Fabricio Amorimm from Fundação Nacional do Índio, the region contains "the greatest concentration of isolated groups in the Amazon and the world".

== Crime ==
A UN report stated that the hotspot in which a reporter was killed "probably [had] among the densest concentration of organized crime groups on earth." In June 2022, The Guardian reporter Dom Phillips and his companion Bruno Pereira were killed in Tabatinga, in the Vale do Javari.

The region is known for being a trafficking route for cocaine. Illegal activities, such as fishing (mostly to export pirarucu and piracatinga), logging and mining, help criminal groups linked to drug trafficking to launder money and import more drugs to Brazil.

"Contacted" native tribes additionally have been reported to make illegal contact with "uncontacted" tribes to exploit their superior hunting skills.

The extensive border with Colombia and Peru causes Tabatinga to be considered by the Federal Police and the Brazilian Army to be one of the main points of entry of cocaine into Brazil. According to Brazilian police authorities, the precarious enforcement of the law and problems of neighboring nations with illicit narcotics production make Tabatinga a frequent point of entry for drugs bound for Brazil's major cities.

== See also ==
- Amazon basin
- Murder of Bruno Pereira and Dom Phillips
- Triple Frontier (film)
- Upper Amazon topics
