= San Pablo =

San Pablo (Spanish for Saint Paul) may refer to:

== Places ==
=== Argentina ===
- San Pablo (Catamarca)
- San Pablo, San Luis

=== Belize ===
- San Pablo, Orange Walk

=== Bolivia ===
- San Pablo de Lípez, Sud Lípez Province

=== Brazil ===
- São Paulo, the capital of São Paulo state, and the country's largest city
- São Paulo State

=== Chile ===
- San Pablo, Chile
- San Pablo (volcano)

=== Colombia ===
- San Pablo, Bolívar
- San Pablo, Nariño
- San Pablo de Borbur

=== Costa Rica ===
- San Pablo (canton), Heredia

=== Cuba ===
- San Pablo, a barrio in Consolación del Sur

=== El Salvador ===
- San Pablo Tacachico, La Libertad

=== Ecuador ===
- San Pablo River (Ecuador)

=== Guatemala ===
- San Pablo, San Marcos
- San Pablo Jocopilas, Suchitepéquez
- San Pablo La Laguna, Sololá

=== Mexico ===
- San Pablo Balleza, Chihuahua
- San Pablo de las Salinas, México State
- San Pablo Guelatao, Oaxaca
- San Pablo Villa de Mitla, Oaxaca

=== Panama ===
- San Pablo River (Panama)

=== Paraguay ===
- San Pablo District, Paraguay
- San Pablo (Asunción)

=== Peru ===
- San Pablo, Cajamarca, San Pablo in the Cajamarca region
- San Pablo, Loreto, San Pablo in Loreto region
- San Pablo District, Bellavista
- San Pablo District, Canchis
- San Pablo District, Mariscal Ramón Castilla
- San Pablo District, San Pablo

=== Philippines ===
- San Pablo, Isabela
- San Pablo, Laguna
- San Pablo, Zamboanga del Sur

=== Spain ===
- San Pablo (Zaragoza), a church
- San Pablo de la Moraleja, Valladolid

=== United States ===
- San Pablo, California
- San Pablo, Colorado
- San Pablo, New Mexico
- San Pablo Bay, California
- Pilot Knob (Imperial County, California)
- San Pablo Island, an unofficial name for the island on the First Coast, containing the Jacksonville Beaches.

== Facilities and structures ==
- San Pablo metro station, a metro station in Santiago, Chile
- San Pablo station (PNR), operated by the Philippine National Railways in Laguna Province, Philippines
- San Pablo station (California), in San Pablo California, United States
- San Pablo (Mexico City Metrobús), a BRT station in Mexico City, Mexico
- San Pablo (Mexibús), a BRT station in Chimalhuacán, Mexico
- San Pablo Airport, Seville, Spain

== Other uses ==
- USS San Pablo (AVP-30), a ship of the United States Navy
- USS San Pablo, a fictional ship in the 1962 novel The Sand Pebbles (novel)
- SS San Pablo, several ships by the name

== See also ==
- "Saint Pablo", a 2016 song by Kanye West
- San Pablo River (disambiguation)
- San Pablo District (disambiguation)
- San Pablo station (disambiguation)
- USS San Pablo (disambiguation)
- Saint Paul (disambiguation)
- San Paolo (disambiguation)
- Sant Pau (disambiguation)
- São Paulo (disambiguation)
- Pablo (disambiguation)
- San (disambiguation)
