= Bellavista =

Bellavista, Spanish and Italian for "beautiful view", may refer to:

== People ==
- Antonio Bellavista (born 1977), Italian footballer
- Girolamo Bellavista (1908–1976), Italian politician

== Places ==
=== Andorra ===
- Hotel Bellavista, a heritage property in Andorra la Vella

=== Bolivia ===
- Bellavista Lake

=== Chile ===
- Barrio Bellavista, an area of Santiago de Chile
- Bellavista Airport (Chile), an airport in the Maule Region of Chile

=== Colombia ===
- Alternative name of Bojayá, a town

=== Denmark ===
- Bellavista housing estate, Klampenborg

=== Ecuador ===
- Bellavista, Ecuador, a neighborhood of Quito
- Bellavista Cloud Forest Reserve, a conservation area
- Estadio Bellavista, a stadium in Ambato

=== Italy ===
- Bellavista, Poggibonsi, a village in the province of Siena, Tuscany
- Bellavista (mountain), a mountain in the Bernina Range between Italy and Switzerland
- Bellavista (climb), a climbing route on the Tre Cime di Lavaredo in the Dolomites

=== Malta ===
- Bellavista, an estate in Marsaskala, residence of the Prime Minister

=== Panama ===
- Bellavista, Panama City, an area of Panama City

=== Peru ===
- Bellavista District, Callao region
- Bellavista de la Unión District, Sechura province
- Bellavista District, Jaén
- Bellavista District, Sullana
- Bellavista Province, San Martín region
  - Bellavista District, Bellavista
    - Bellavista, Bellavista, capital of the province

=== Spain ===
- Bellavista (Franqueses del Vallès, Spain), a neighborhood in Franqueses del Vallès
- Bellavista-La Palmera, a district of Seville
  - Bellavista, Seville, a neighborhood

=== Switzerland ===
- Bellavista railway station, on the Monte Generoso mountain railway in the canton of Ticino

== Other uses ==
- Club Atlético Bella Vista a football club in Uruguay
- Bellavista (band), American rock band

== See also ==
- Bela Vista (district of São Paulo), Brazil
- Bella Vista (disambiguation)
