= San Pablo District =

San Pablo District may refer to

== Places ==
=== Paraguay ===
- San Pablo District, Paraguay, in San Pedro department

=== Peru ===
- San Pablo District, Bellavista, in Bellavista province, San Martín region
- San Pablo District, Canchis, in Bellavista province, Cusco region
- San Pablo District, Mariscal Ramón Castilla, in Mariscal Ramón Castilla province, Loreto region
- San Pablo District, San Pablo, in San Pablo province, Cajamarca region

=== Costa Rica ===
- San Pablo District, Barva, in Barva Canton, Heredia province
- San Pablo District, León Cortés Castro, in León Cortés Canton, San José province
- San Pablo District, Nandayure, in Nandayure Canton, Guanacaste province
- San Pablo District, San Pablo, Heredia, in San Pablo Canton, Heredia province
- San Pablo District, Turrubares, in Turrubares Canton, San José province

== See also ==
- San Pablo (disambiguation)
