= San Pablo Municipality =

San Pablo Municipality may refer to:

- San Pablo, Bolívar, Colombia
- San Pablo, Nariño, Colombia
- San Pablo, San Marcos, Honduras
- San Pablo, Isabela, Philippines
- San Pablo, Zamboanga del Sur, Philippines
