= Bela Vista (disambiguation) =

Bela Vista is an Italian neighborhood in São Paulo, Brazil.

Bela Vista may also refer to

== Places ==
=== Brazil ===
- Bela Vista, Mato Grosso do Sul
- Bela Vista da Caroba, Paraná
- Bela Vista de Goiás, Goiás
- Bela Vista de Minas, Minas Gerais
- Bela Vista do Maranhão, Maranhão
- Bela Vista do Paraíso, Paraná
- Bela Vista do Piauí, Piauí
- Bela Vista do Toldo, Santa Catarina
- São Sebastião da Bela Vista, Minas Gerais

=== Other countries ===
- Bela Vista, Angola
- Bela Vista, São Tomé and Príncipe
- Bela Vista Park, Lisbon, Portugal

== Other uses ==
- Bela Vista (Lisbon Metro), a railway station in Lisbon, Portugal
- Bela Vista (São Paulo Metro), a railway station under construction in São Paulo, Brazil
- Bela Vista Futebol Clube, a Brazilian football club

== See also ==
- Bella Vista (disambiguation)
- Bellavista (disambiguation)
