= San Luis District =

San Luis District may refer to:

- San Luis District, Cañete, Peru
- San Luis District, Carlos Fermín Fitzcarrald, Peru
- San Luis District, Lima, Peru
- San Luis District, San Pablo, Peru
- San Luis District, Turrubares, San José province, Costa Rica
