= SS San Pablo =

SS San Pablo is a ship's name. The shipname is derived from Saint Paul (Spanish: San Pablo), a Christian saint, with the ship prefix "SS" which stands for steamship.

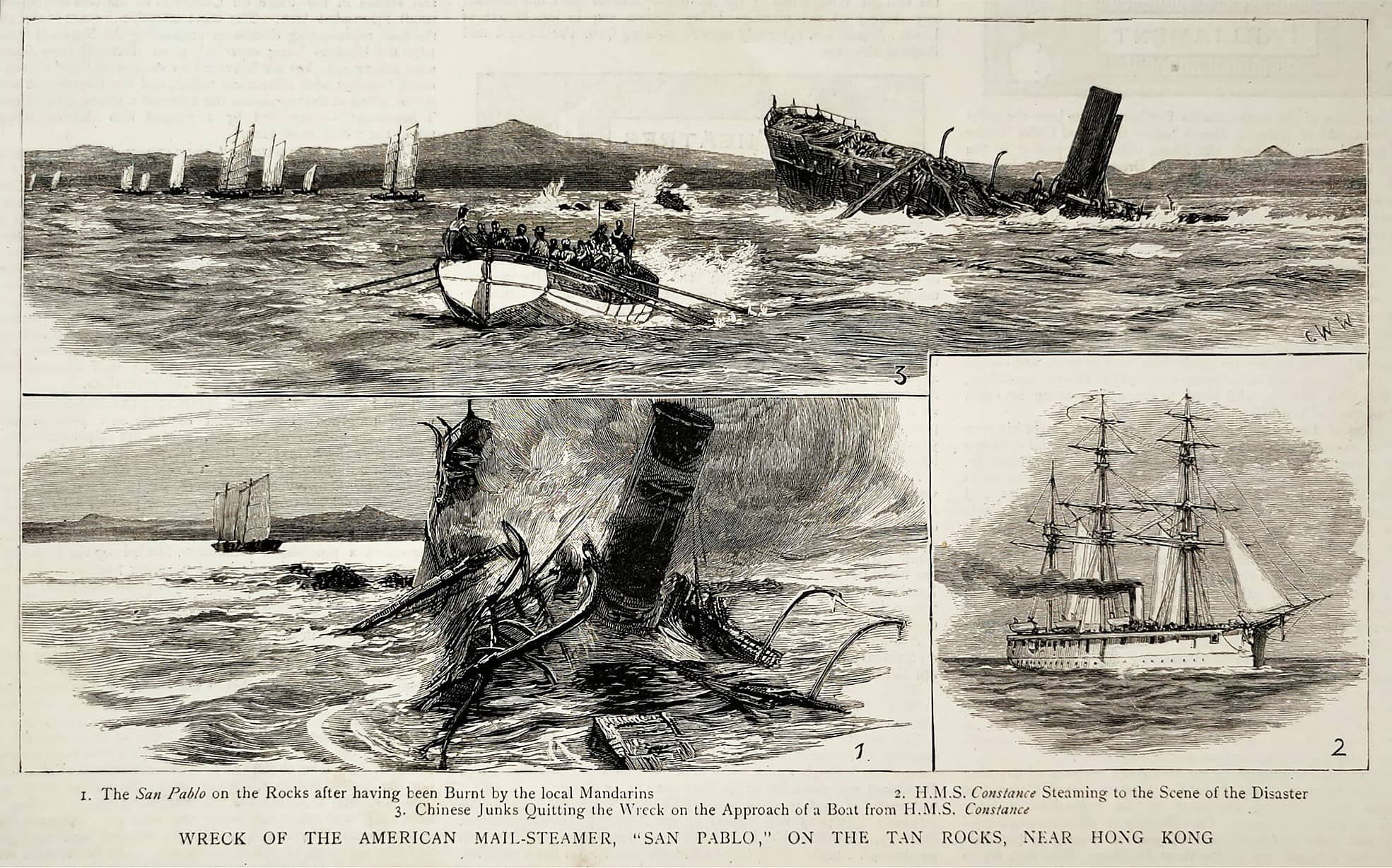
Sinking of San Pablo in 1888

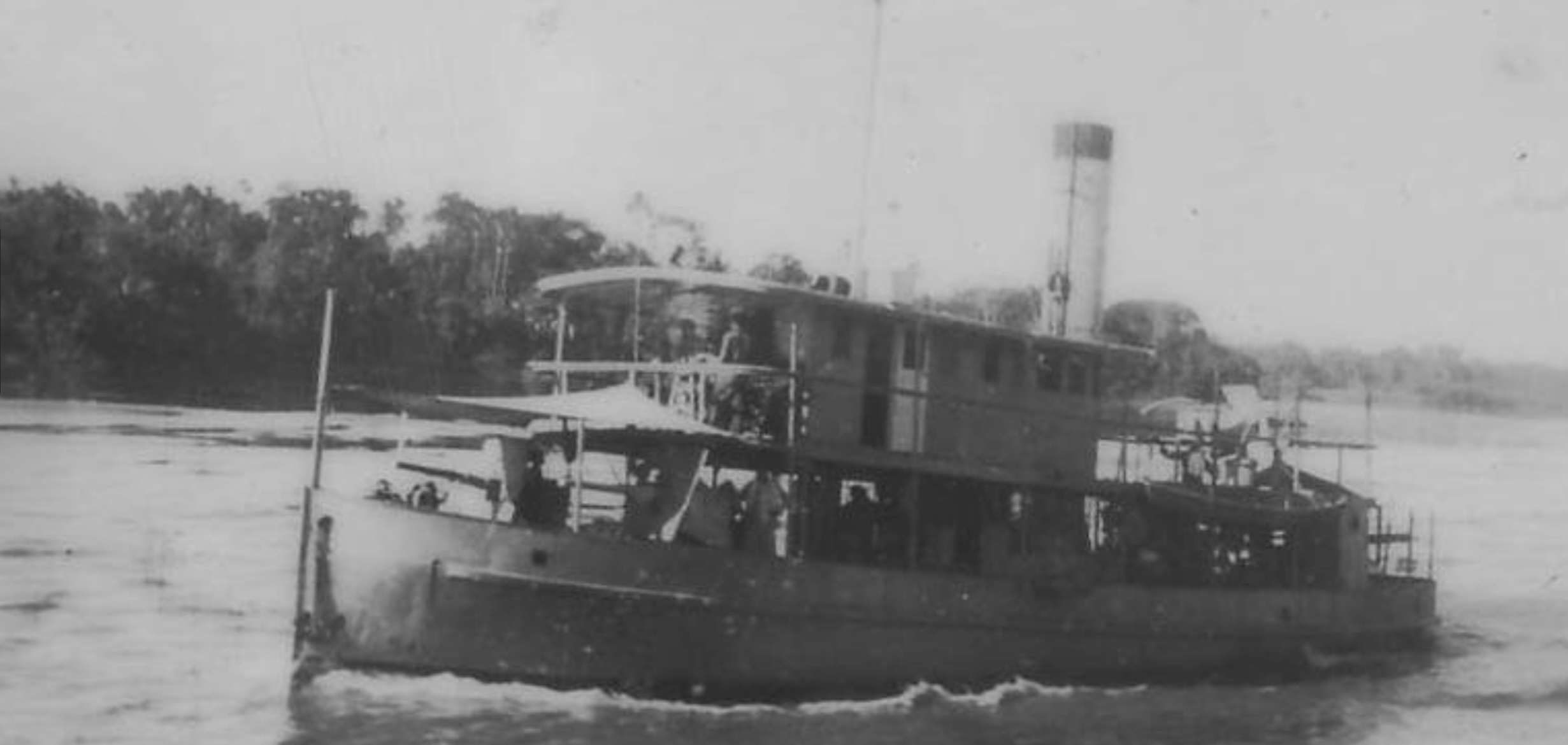
the ex-SS San Pablo 1902, as the gunboat Coronel Portillo in 1928

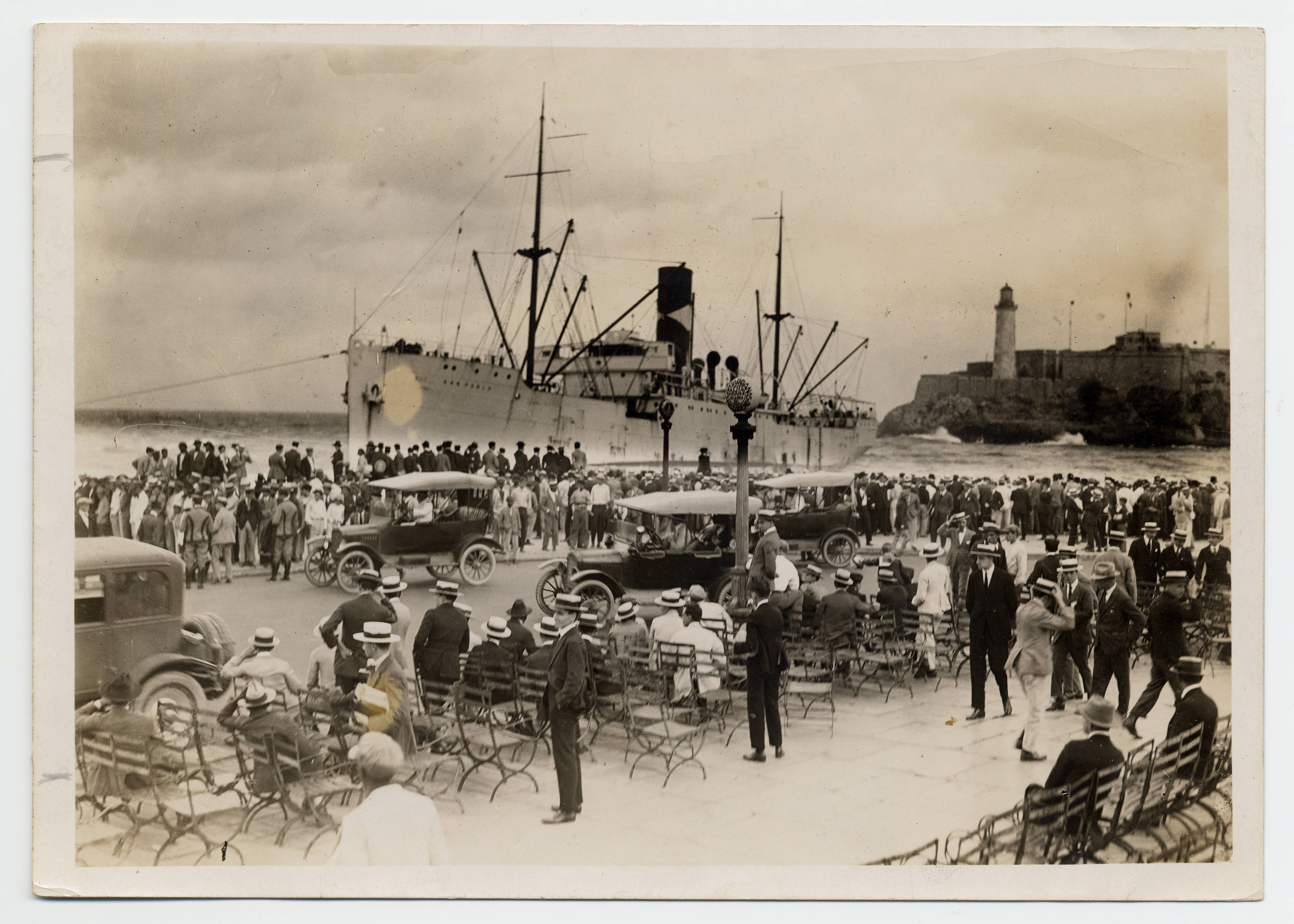
San Pablo 1915 ship in 1920 that later sank in 1942

== List ==
Ships carrying this name include:

- SS San Pablo (sank 1888), a 19th-century passenger collier running service between San Francisco and Hong Kong for the Occidental and Oriental Steamship Company; that wrecked on 20 April 1888, having run aground on Niushan Island, Fujian Province, China; was captured by pirates and burned
- SS San Pablo (1902), a river steamboat built in 1902, that served as the Peruvian river gunboat Coronel Portillo 1929–1959.
- SS San Pablo (1915), a refrigerated merchant steamship built in 1915, that sank on 3 July 1942 in Puerto Limon, Costa Rica, which was sunk by the German submarine U-161 in World War II, that was refloated and sunk in 1943 as a targetship near Panama City, Florida, US; and now serves as a dive site called "Russian Freighter" in the Pensacola region; see Naval Base Trinidad
- SS San Pablo (tanker) (IMO number: 542237), a tanker ship, a Liberty ship built in 1943 as Paul Tulane (244681); the former USS Kangaroo (IX-121), in U.S. Navy service 1943–1946; receiving the name "San Pablo" in 1963, scrapped in 1969.
- SS San Pablo (ferry), a 20th-century car ferry operating in Brickyard Cove, Richmond, California, United States

== See also ==
- USS San Pablo (disambiguation)
- San Pablo (disambiguation)
