= San Bernardino District =

San Bernardino District may refer to:

- San Bernardino District, Paraguay, in the Cordillera Department
- San Bernardino District, San Pablo, Peru

== See also ==
- San Bernardino (disambiguation)
