= San Pablo River =

San Pablo River can refer to:

- San Pablo River (Ecuador)
- San Pablo River (Panama)
- San Pablo River (Florida), USA; part of the Intracoastal Waterway

== See also ==
- San Pablo (disambiguation)
