= San Pablo Cathedral =

San Pablo Cathedral may refer to:

- St. Paul's Cathedral, Valparaíso, Chile
- Saint Paul the First Hermit Cathedral, Philippines

== See also ==
- San Pablo (disambiguation)
- Saint Paul (disambiguation)
- St. Paul's Church (disambiguation)
