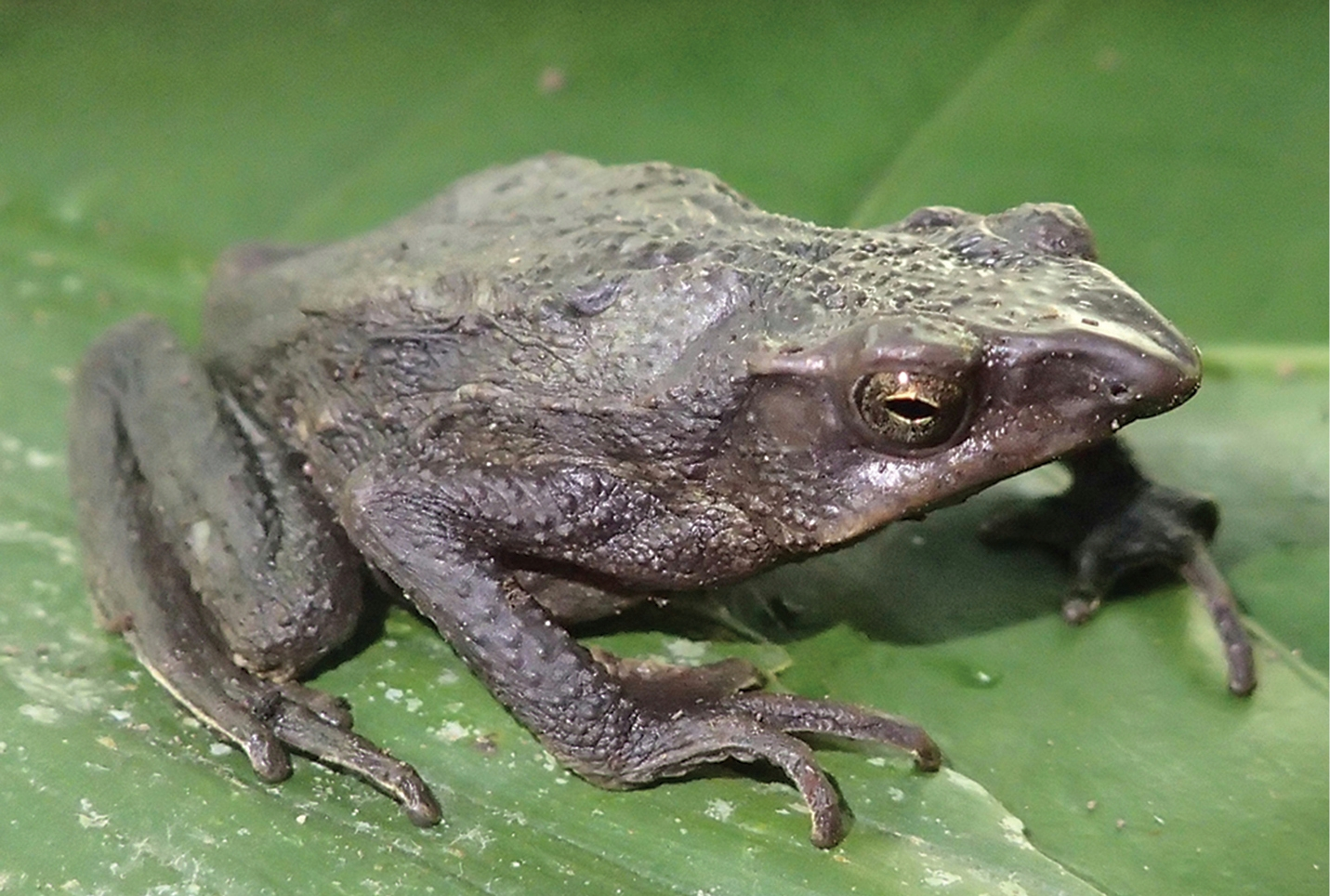
- A specimen of R. lilyrodriguezae photographed during the day

Scientific classification
- Kingdom: Animalia
- Phylum: Chordata
- Class: Amphibia
- Order: Anura
- Family: Bufonidae
- Genus: Rhinella
- Species: R. lilyrodriguezae

Binomial name
- Rhinella lilyrodriguezae Cusi, Moravec, Lehr, and Gvoždík, 2017
- The green dot corresponds to where the holotype was found and the red lines are the boundary of the Cordillera Azul National Park.

= Rhinella lilyrodriguezae =

Species of frog

Rhinella lilyrodriguezae is a species of frog in the family Bufonidae, which is found in Cordillera Azul National Park in Peru.

Some of the striking characteristics of the species are the elongated snout and the color change between day and night, becoming lighter during the day.

It was described on May 12, 2017 by four researchers in the journal ZooKeys. Its name is a tribute to researcher Lily Rodriguez, who was responsible for the discovery of several species and the creation of several national parks in Peru. It does not yet have an official conservation status defined, but researchers classify it as a data deficient species.

== Taxonomy ==
The species was described on May 12, 2017, by biologists Juan C. Cusi, Jiří Moravec, Edgar Lehr and Václav Gvoždík in the scientific journal ZooKeys. It was described as belonging to the genus Rhinella, but specifically to the Rhinella festae clade, the result of which was discovered from genetic and molecular analyses. A total of six individuals were collected in Cordillera Azul National Park in 2013, and the holotype was found in Alto Biavo, at an altitude of 1 260 meters, on September 27, 2013, and it was a pregnant female. It was diagnosed as a new species because it had a number of unique characteristics, such as being large in size, having eight pre-sacral vertebrae, with the sacrum fused to the coccyx, an elongated and pointed snout, and its coloration. Genetic tests were also done on the mitochondrial 16S rRNA gene, attesting to its specialization. It was named Rhinella lilyrodriguezae in honor of herpetologist Lily Rodriguez, for her discoveries in the area of Peruvian amphibians and for promoting the creation of several natural parks in Peru, such as the one where the species was discovered.

== Distribution and conservation ==
Currently, the only place where the species has been found is Cordillera Azul National Park, in the Alto Biavo district in northern Peru, with elevations between 1,245 and 1,280. Here there is noise pollution and extraction of wood and soil, which together with the habits of the local population, such as subsistence hunting and extensive fishing, threaten the local biodiversity. So far the species has not been categorized by the International Union for Conservation of Nature (IUCN), so there is no official conservation status, but researchers suggest its classification as a data-deficient species. With its discovery, 94 species of the genus Rhinella are totaled.

== Description ==
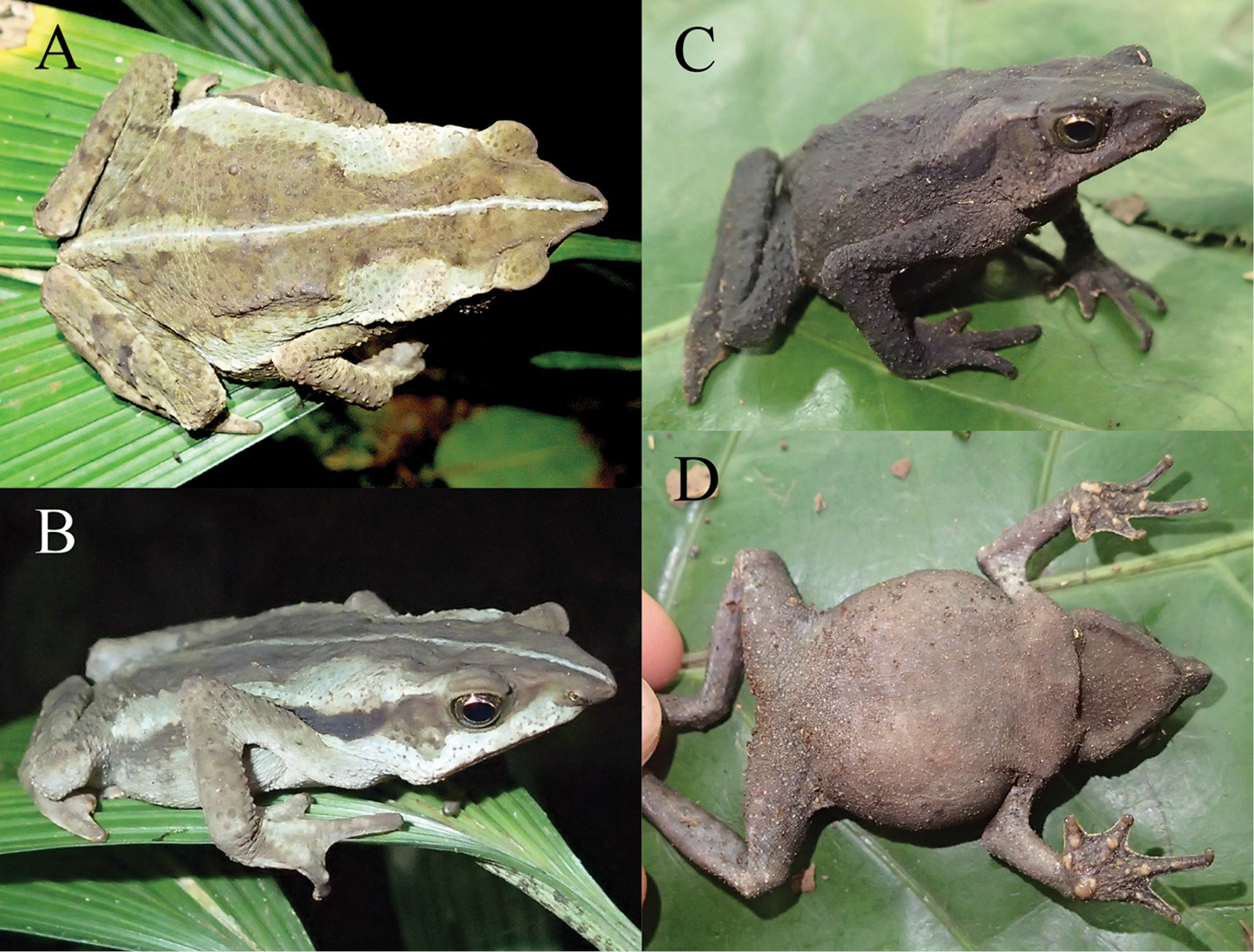
On the left, an individual during the night, and on the right, an individual during the day.

Females measure between 47.1 and 58.3 millimeters, and the size of males is not known. The head, which is triangular when seen from above and narrower than the body, accounts for 30% of their length. Its snout is elongated, with a rounded tip, long, protruding, and directed towards the anteroventral region (similar to that of a shark). Its canthus rostralis is rounded, with a concave loreal region, and the nostrils are small, round, directed toward the sides, and are not prominent. The tympanic ring is weakly defined, with the superficial tympanic membrane present, and there is no contact with the parotid glands, which are relatively large. Its back is covered by small, rounded, elevated tubercles with keratinized tips. Its tongue is thin, 2.5 times larger than the body, and its choana is small and oval.

During the day, its back and flanks are dark brown, with dark green spots distributed between the sacral region and the parotoid glands, and the throat is dark gray. Its iris is silver-green, with irregular black spots. At night its back is light brown, with a whitish-gray line between the muzzle and the cloca, and the tip of the muzzle, eye, eyebrow, and crown of the head are light gray.

== Ecology ==
It is a nocturnal and semi-arboreal species, with all individuals found at night between 20:33 and 22:49 local time, on leaves of bushes that were between ten and one hundred centimeters high. One of the females found was pregnant, containing 185 eggs in her ovaries. The presence of pigmented eggs, large in number, and the association of individuals with bodies of water, makes one imagine that the tadpoles are endotrophic, and may have direct development or development of tadpoles that do not feed in water or wet soil. There are no records of their vocalization.
