= Sechura province =

Coordinates: 5°33′36″S 80°49′12″W

Sechura
- Province
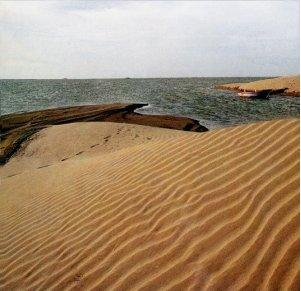
- La Niña lake, Sechura Province

- Flag Coat of arms

- Location of Sechura in the Piura Region
- Country: Peru
- Region: Piura
- Founded: December 23, 1993
- Capital: Sechura

Government
  - Mayor: Justo Eche Morales (2019-2022)

Area
  - Total: 6,369.93 km^{2} (2,459.44 sq mi)

Population
  - Total: 79,177
  - Density: 12.430/km^{2} (32.193/sq mi)
- UBIGEO: 2008
- Website: www.munisechura.gob.pe

Sechura is the largest of eight provinces of the Piura Region in Peru.

== Location ==
The province is located on the shores of the Pacific Ocean in the extreme north of Peru, just below the upper most Tumbes Region which is on the border with Ecuador.

== Boundaries ==
- North: province of Paita
- East: Lambayeque Region
- South: Pacific Ocean.
- West: Pacific Ocean.

== Political division ==
The province has an area of 6,369.93 square kilometers (2,459.44 sq mi) and is divided into six districts.

- Sechura
- Bellavista de la Unión
- Bernal
- Cristo nos Valga
- Rinconada Llicuar
- Vice

== Population ==
The province has an approximate population of 47,000 inhabitants.

== Capital ==
The capital of this province is the city of Sechura.

== See also ==
- Piura Region
- Peru
