= Rinconada Llicuar District =

Coordinates: 5.4637°S 80.7653°W

Rinconada Llicuar
- District
- Interactive map of Rinconada Llicuar
- Country: Peru
- Region: Piura
- Province: Sechura
- Founded: February 19, 1965
- Capital: Dos Pueblos

Government
  - Mayor: Walter Martinez Vite

Area
  - Total: 19.44 km^{2} (7.51 sq mi)
- Elevation: 10 m (33 ft)

Population (2005 census)
  - Total: 2,642
  - Density: 135.9/km^{2} (352.0/sq mi)
- Time zone: UTC-5 (PET)
- UBIGEO: 200806

Rinconada Llicuar District is one of six districts of the province Sechura in Peru.
