= Vice District =

Coordinates: 5.4216°S 80.7743°W

Vice
- District
- Interactive map of Vice
- Country: Peru
- Region: Piura
- Province: Sechura
- Founded: June 15, 1920
- Capital: Vice

Government
  - Mayor: Armando Bancayan Amaya

Area
  - Total: 324.62 km^{2} (125.34 sq mi)
- Elevation: 15 m (49 ft)

Population (2005 census)
  - Total: 11,793
  - Density: 36.329/km^{2} (94.091/sq mi)
- Time zone: UTC-5 (PET)
- UBIGEO: 200805

Vice District is one of six districts of the province Sechura in Peru.
