= USS San Pablo =

USS San Pablo may refer to:

== Ships ==
- USS San Pablo (AVP-30), a United States Navy ship in commission as a seaplane tender from 1943 to 1947 and as a hydrographic survey ship from 1948 to 1969

== Fictional ships ==
- USS San Pablo, a fictional United States Navy gunboat that is the setting for the 1962 novel The Sand Pebbles (novel) and the 1966 movie The Sand Pebbles

== See also ==
- SS San Pablo
- San Pablo (disambiguation)
