= Pablo (disambiguation) =

Pablo is a Spanish masculine given name.

Pablo may also refer to:

== Places ==
- Pablo (Primero de Enero), a Cuban village in Ciego de Ávila Province
- Pablo, Montana, a town in the United States

== People ==
- Pablo (Filipino musician) (born 1994), Filipino singer and member of boy band SB19
- Pablo (footballer, born 1987), Brazilian footballer Pablo Freitas Cardoso Mello
- Pablo (footballer, born March 1991), Brazilian footballer Pablo Ricardo de Souza
- Pablo (footballer, born June 1991), Brazilian footballer Pablo Nascimento Castro
- Pablo (footballer, born 1992), Brazilian footballer Pablo Felipe Teixeira
- Pablo (footballer, born 1996), Brazilian footballer Pablo Augusto Servo de Carvalho
- Pablo (footballer, born 2004), Portuguese footballer Pablo Felipe Pereira de Jesus
- Pablo (footballer, born 2006), Brazilian footballer Pablo Pereira da Costa

== Art, entertainment, and media ==
- Pablo (film), a 2012 American documentary about Pablo Ferro
- Pablo (TV series), a 2017 British children's television series centred around a five-year-old boy with autism that airs on CBeebies
- "Pablo", a song by Screaming Jets from their 2004 EP Heart of the Matter
- Pablo Records, a jazz record label
- The Life of Pablo, a 2016 album released by Kanye West
- "Pablo", a 2022 song from Kanye West's album, Donda 2, featuring American rappers Travis Scott and Future

== Other uses ==
- Tropical Storm Pablo

== See also ==
- San Pablo (disambiguation)
