= Bella Vista, Corrientes =

Bella Vista Vélla Vísta (Guarani)
- City
- Location of Bella Vista in Argentina
- Coordinates: 28°28′S 59°03′W
- Country: Argentina
- Province: Corrientes
- Department: Bella Vista
- Founded: June 3, 1825

Area
  - Total: 1,706 km^{2} (659 sq mi)
- Elevation: 57 m (187 ft)

Population (2012)
  - Total: 28,750
  - Density: 16.85/km^{2} (43.65/sq mi)
- Demonym: bellavistense
- Time zone: UTC−3 (ART)
- CPA base: W3432
- Dialing code: +54 3777
- Climate: Cfa
- Website: Official website

Bella Vista (Guarani: Vélla Vísta) is a city in Corrientes Province, Argentina. It is the capital of the Bella Vista Department. The city is near the Paraná River. The city is a popular tourist spot in the summertime.

== Geography ==
The small village is located somewhat far from the provincial capital Corrientes and 891 km from Buenos Aires.

== See also ==
- Bella Vista (disambiguation)
