= Cristo Nos Valga District =

Coordinates: 5.4936°S 80.7411°W

Cristo Nos Valga
- District
- Interactive map of Cristo Nos Valga
- Country: Peru
- Region: Piura
- Province: Sechura
- Founded: February 19, 1965
- Capital: San Cristo

Government
  - Mayor: Angel Agurto Pingo

Area
  - Total: 234.37 km^{2} (90.49 sq mi)
- Elevation: 9 m (30 ft)

Population (2005 census)
  - Total: 3,185
  - Density: 13.59/km^{2} (35.20/sq mi)
- Time zone: UTC-5 (PET)
- UBIGEO: 200804

Cristo Nos Valga District is one of six districts of the province Sechura in Peru.
