= Tumbadén District =

Coordinates: 7.0250°S 78.7391°W

Tumbaden
- District
- Interactive map of Tumbaden
- Country: Peru
- Region: Cajamarca
- Province: San Pablo
- Founded: December 11, 1981
- Capital: Tumbaden

Area
  - Total: 264.37 km^{2} (102.07 sq mi)
- Elevation: 3,075 m (10,089 ft)

Population (2005 census)
  - Total: 3,904
  - Density: 14.77/km^{2} (38.25/sq mi)
- Time zone: UTC-5 (PET)
- UBIGEO: 061204

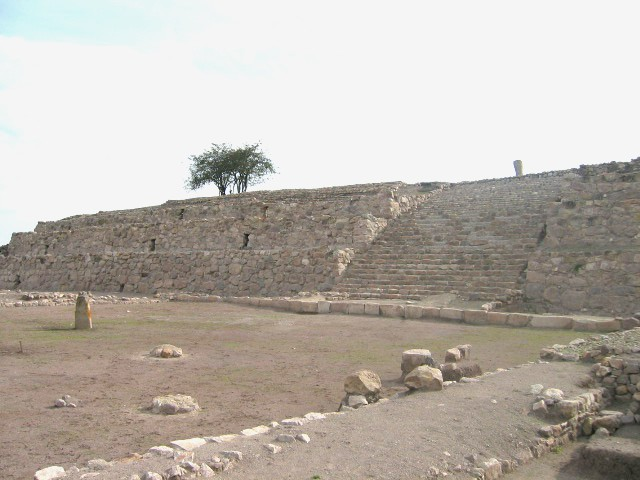

Tumbaden District is one of four districts of the province San Pablo in Peru.
