= Huallaga District =

Coordinates: 7.1285°S 76.6545°W

Huallaga
- District
- Interactive map of Huallaga
- Country: Peru
- Region: San Martín
- Province: Bellavista
- Founded: March 19, 1965
- Capital: Ledoy

Government
  - Mayor: Alex Rengifo Isuiza

Area
  - Total: 210.42 km^{2} (81.24 sq mi)
- Elevation: 310 m (1,020 ft)

Population (2005 census)
  - Total: 2,912
  - Density: 13.84/km^{2} (35.84/sq mi)
- Time zone: UTC-5 (PET)
- UBIGEO: 220204

Huallaga District is one of six districts of the province Bellavista in Peru.
