= San Rafael District, Bellavista =

Coordinates: 7.0236°S 76.4650°W

San Rafael District
- District
- Interactive map of San Rafael District
- Country: Peru
- Region: San Martín
- Province: Bellavista
- Founded: January 5, 1945
- Capital: San Rafael

Government
  - Mayor: Juan Teofilo Paima Diaz

Area
  - Total: 98.32 km^{2} (37.96 sq mi)
- Elevation: 211 m (692 ft)

Population (2005 census)
  - Total: 5,792
  - Density: 58.91/km^{2} (152.6/sq mi)
- Time zone: UTC-5 (PET)
- UBIGEO: 220206

San Rafael District is one of six districts of the province Bellavista in Peru.
