= San Pablo Church Ruins =

Roman Catholic church ruins in Isabela, Philippines

San Pablo Church
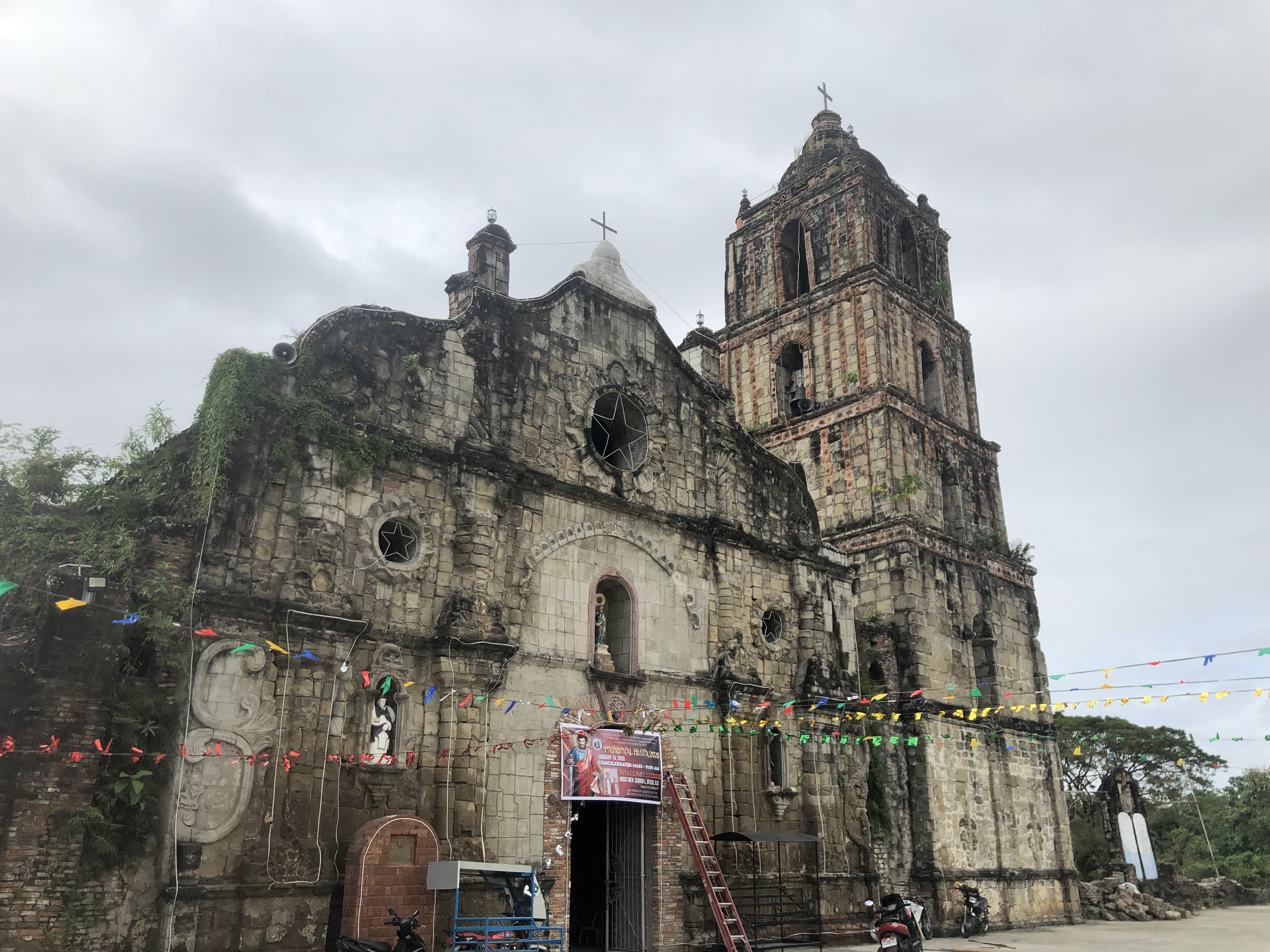
- The church in 2026

- Location in Luzon Location in the Philippines
- 17°26′54″N 121°47′37″E
- Location: San Pablo, Isabela
- Country: Philippines
- Denomination: Roman Catholic

History
- Status: Ruins

Architecture
- Functional status: Inactive (original church); Active (chapel within the ruins)
- Heritage designation: National Cultural Treasure
- Architectural type: Church building
- Style: Baroque
- Completed: 1624; 402 years ago

San Pablo Church is a ruined Roman Catholic church located in San Pablo, Isabela, Philippines. The church was built in 1624, making it the oldest in Isabela.

== History ==
The church was damaged during World War II. In 1949, it was destroyed by the 7-magnitude earthquake that hit the Cagayan Valley, and its roof was burned down in the 1950s. Unable to renovate, a smaller church, one-third the size of San Pablo Church, was built inside the walls.

=== Present situation ===
Fronting the church is a patio overgrown with grass. Still standing is the church's facade, with visible bas-relief and religious icons on each side. The church's arched main entrance, vigil room, support for the choir loft, and buttresses, which continue to support the structure, are still visible.

==== Restoration ====
The National Museum of the Philippines declared the church as a national cultural treasure, which by law makes it a priority for future restoration and government funding. No restoration program has yet to be initiated by the government's main cultural agencies. Parish and local government officials have also not yet requested restoration programs towards the national government's cultural agencies.

== Architecture ==
The Baroque-styled church was constructed using bricks mixed with riverstones, adobe and coral stones. Its belfry of six layers, including the circular apex made of adobe, was the tallest in the Cagayan Valley.

== Gallery ==
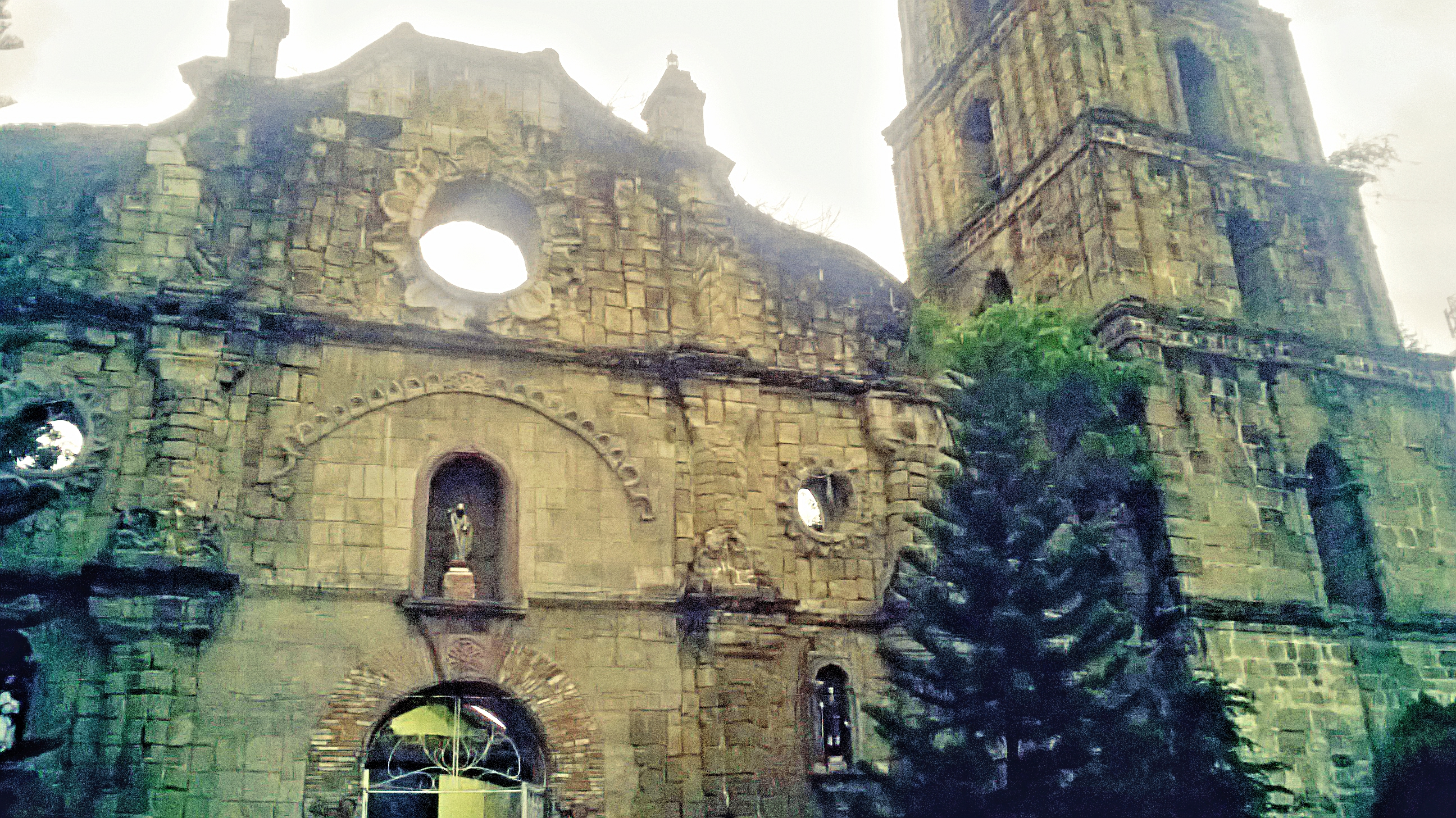
Facade in 2013

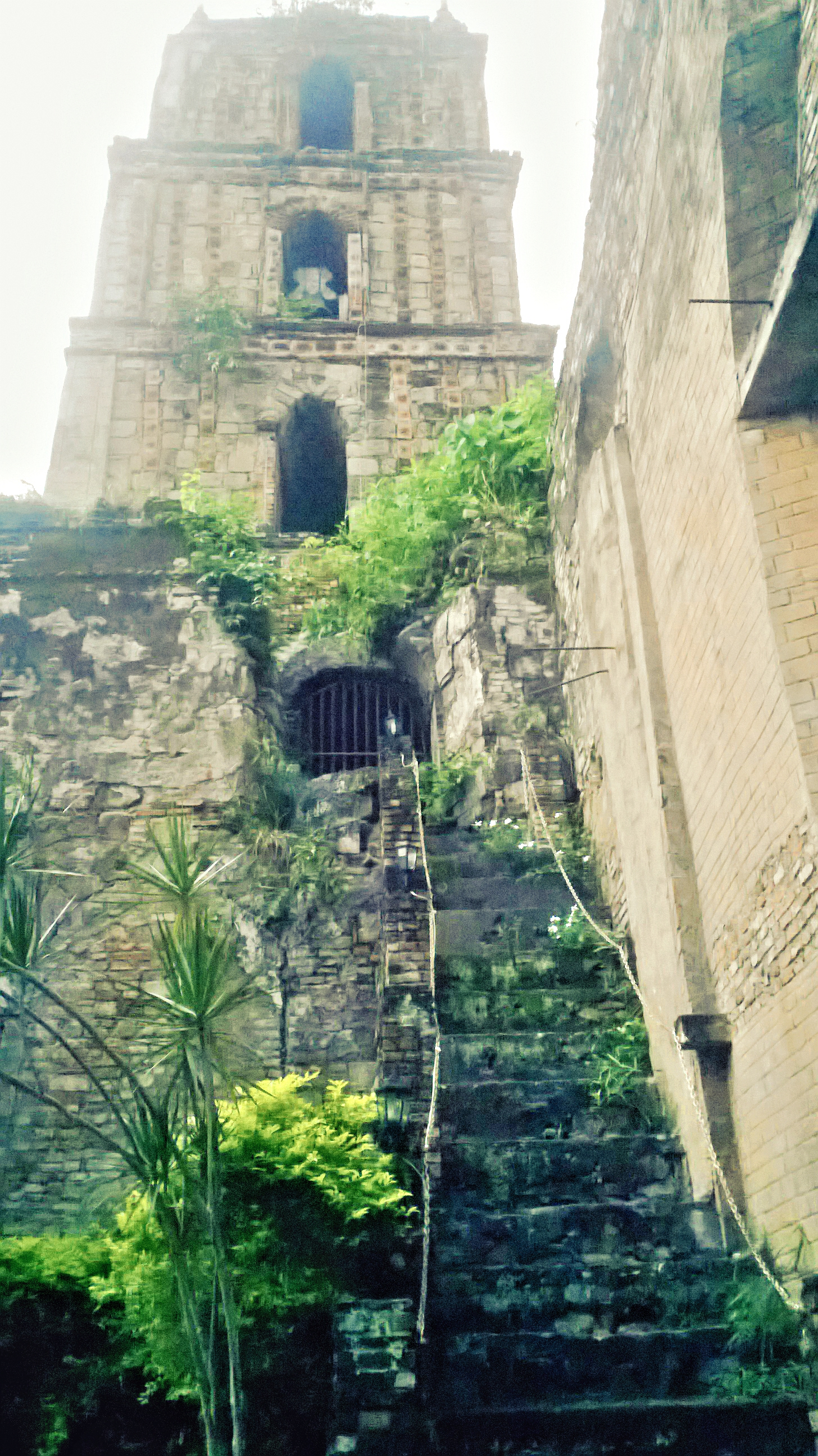
Belfry

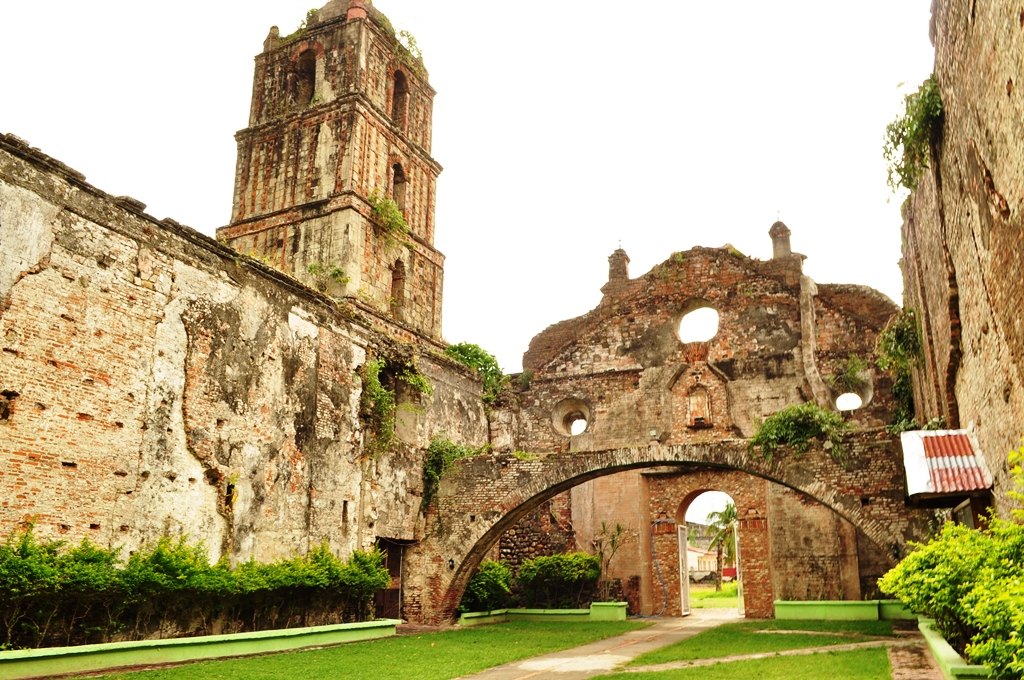
Interior in 2013

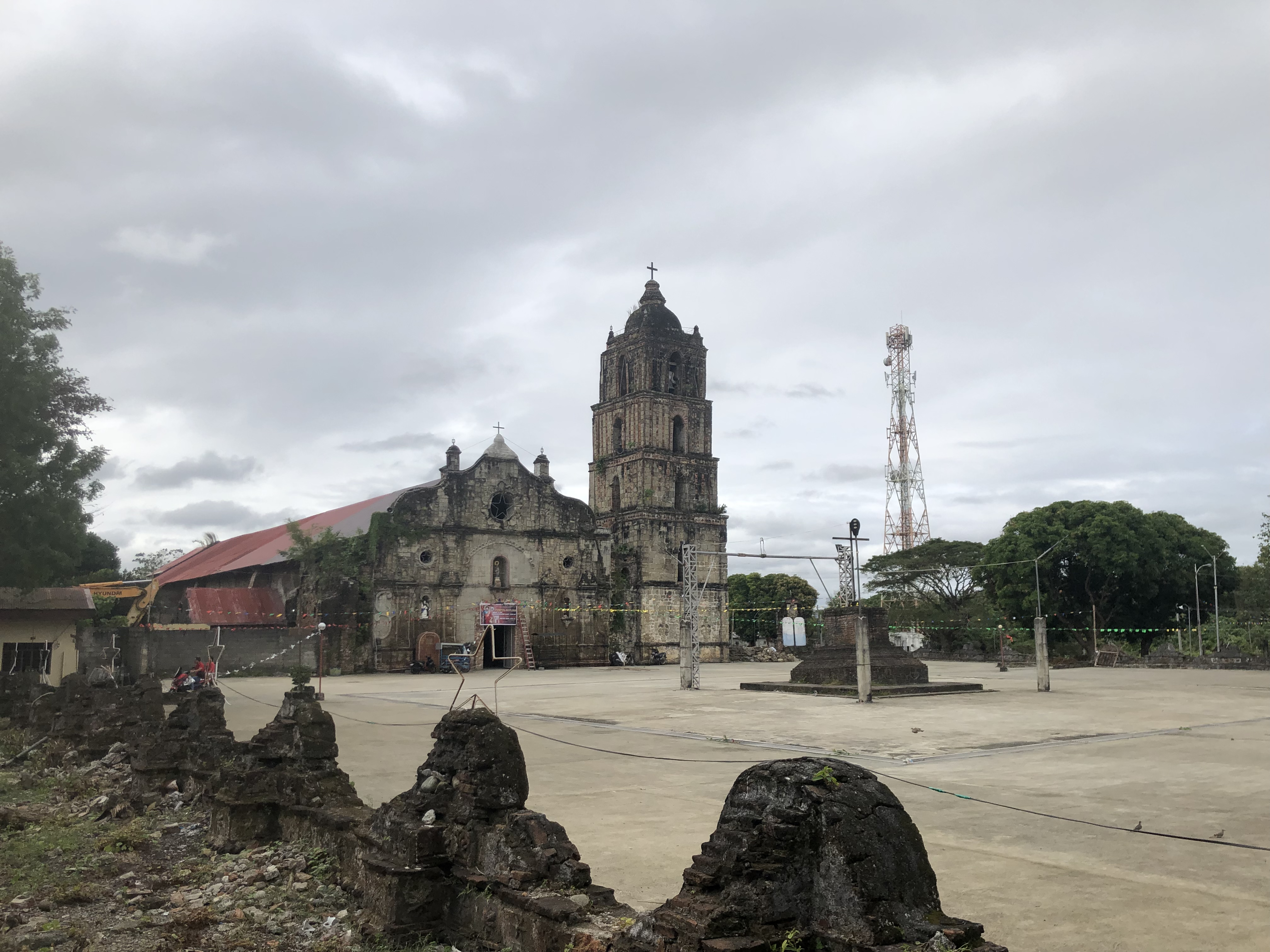
The church in 2026

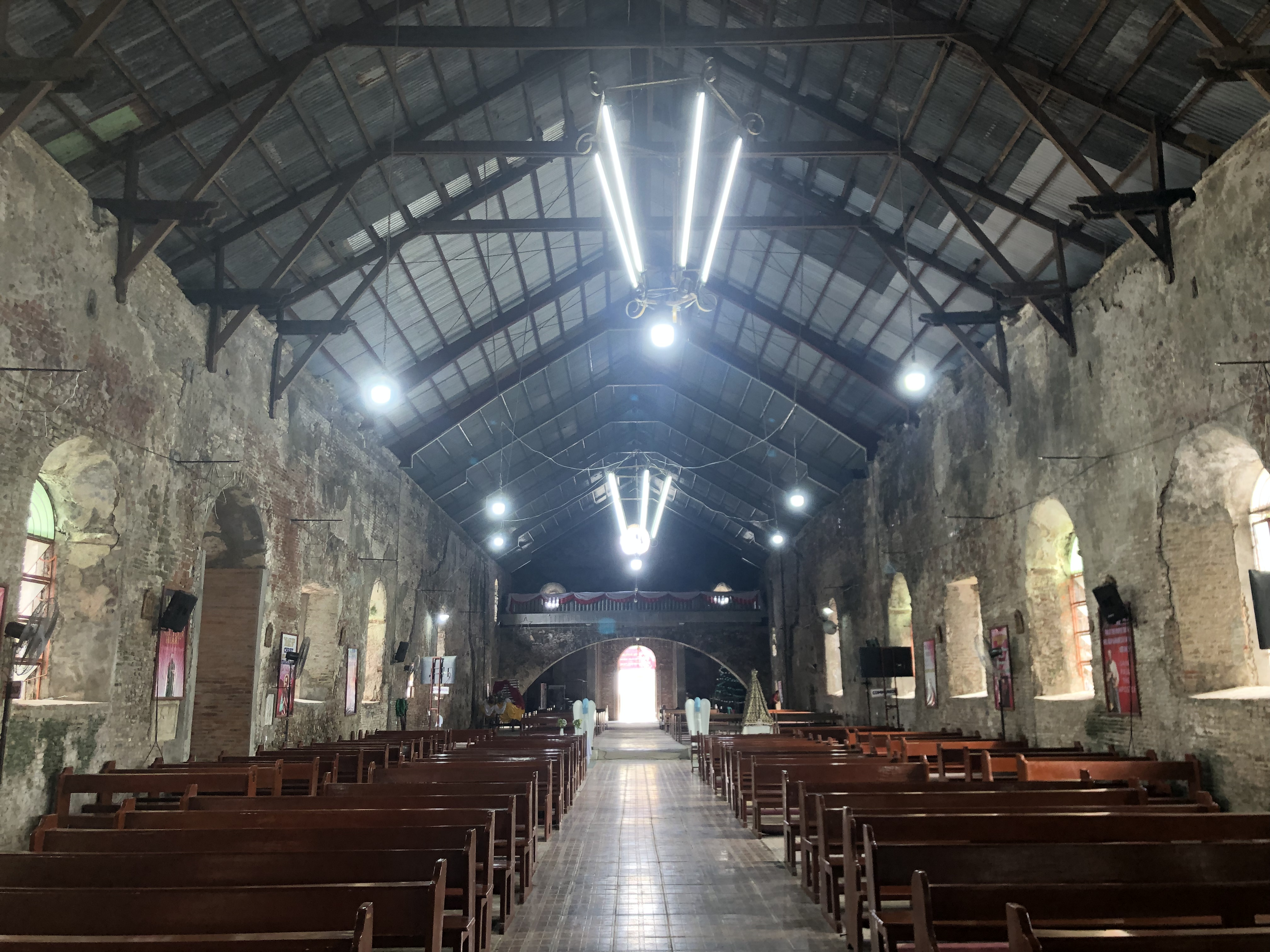
The church interior in 2026. The church's nave has been entirely covered by a roof.
