= Bajo Biavo District =

Coordinates: 7.0308°S 76.4764°W

Bajo Biavo
- District
- Interactive map of Bajo Biavo
- Country: Peru
- Region: San Martín
- Province: Bellavista
- Founded: January 31, 1944
- Capital: Nuevo Lima

Government
  - Mayor: Juan Siguenas Vaca

Area
  - Total: 975.43 km^{2} (376.62 sq mi)
- Elevation: 230 m (750 ft)

Population (2005 census)
  - Total: 8,594
  - Density: 8.810/km^{2} (22.82/sq mi)
- Time zone: UTC-5 (PET)
- UBIGEO: 220203

Bajo Biavo District is one of six districts of the province Bellavista in Peru.

== Climate ==
Climate data for La Union, Bajo Biavo, elevation 262 m (860 ft), (1991–2020)
Month	Jan	Feb	Mar	Apr	May	Jun	Jul	Aug	Sep	Oct	Nov	Dec	Year
Mean daily maximum °C (°F)	34.1 (93.4)	33.2 (91.8)	32.5 (90.5)	32.2 (90.0)	32.5 (90.5)	32.3 (90.1)	32.7 (90.9)	33.6 (92.5)	34.1 (93.4)	34.0 (93.2)	33.9 (93.0)	33.8 (92.8)	33.2 (91.8)
Mean daily minimum °C (°F)	20.6 (69.1)	20.6 (69.1)	20.4 (68.7)	20.3 (68.5)	20.0 (68.0)	19.2 (66.6)	18.5 (65.3)	18.5 (65.3)	19.1 (66.4)	20.1 (68.2)	20.6 (69.1)	20.7 (69.3)	19.9 (67.8)
Average precipitation mm (inches)	46.3 (1.82)	87.9 (3.46)	110.5 (4.35)	103.3 (4.07)	65.6 (2.58)	52.0 (2.05)	51.0 (2.01)	49.3 (1.94)	70.3 (2.77)	86.7 (3.41)	107.6 (4.24)	79.7 (3.14)	910.2 (35.84)
Source: National Meteorology and Hydrology Service of Peru
