= Sechura District =

Coordinates: 5.5575°S 80.8223°W

Sechura
- District
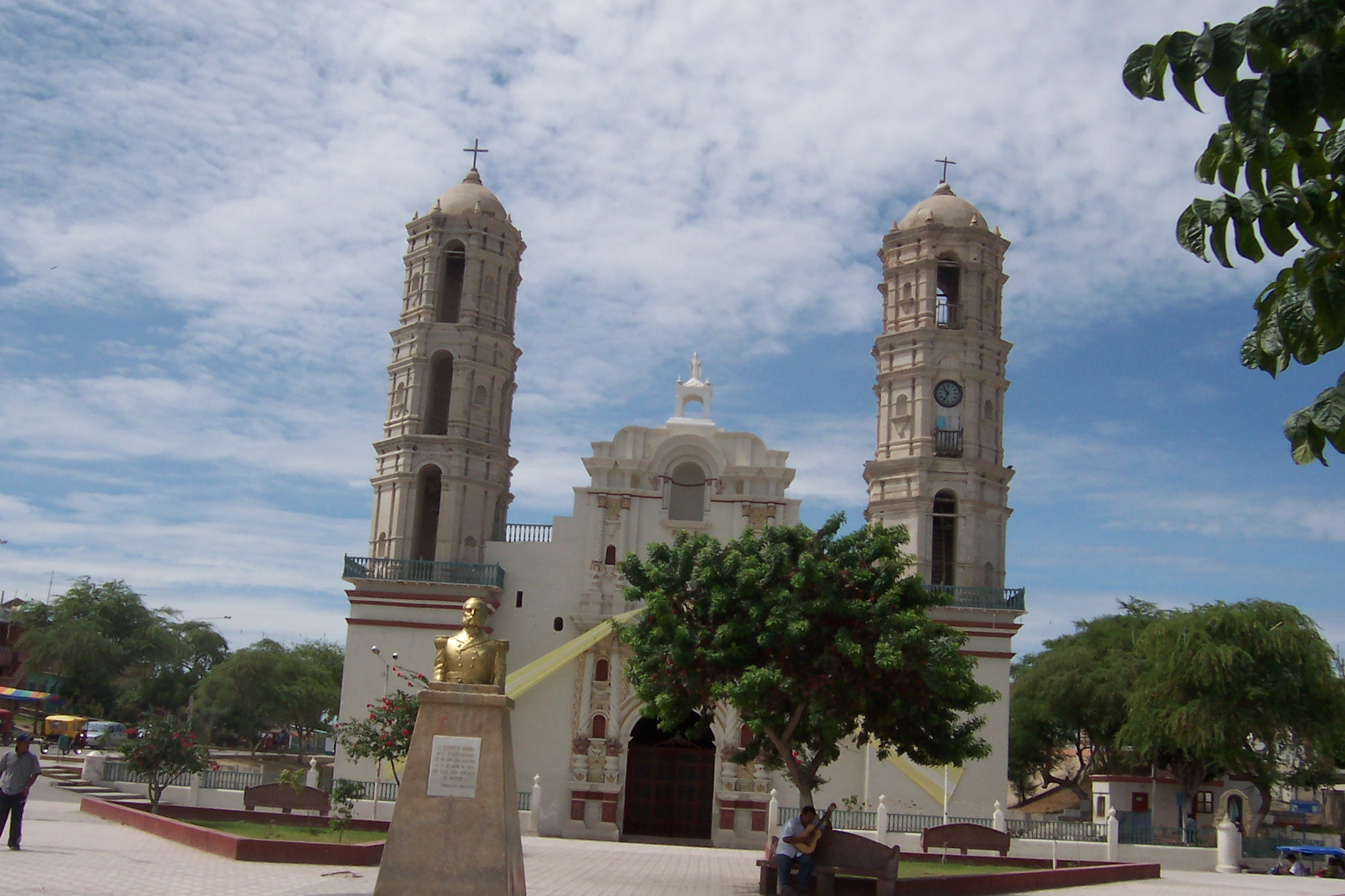
- Sechura cathedral
- Interactive map of Sechura
- Country: Peru
- Region: Piura
- Province: Sechura
- Capital: Sechura

Government
  - Mayor: Justo Eche Morales

Area
  - Total: 5,711.25 km^{2} (2,205.13 sq mi)

Population (2017)
  - Total: 44,590
  - Density: 7.807/km^{2} (20.22/sq mi)
- Time zone: UTC-5 (PET)

The Sechura District is one of the six districts that make up the Sechura Province in the Piura Region of Peru.

== Authorities ==
=== Mayors ===
- 2011-2014: José Bernardo Pazo Nunura, Partido Humanista Peruano.
- 2007-2010: Santos Valentín Querevalú Periche, Movimiento de Desarrollo Local.
- 2003-2006 / 1994-1998: Justo Eche Morales, Movimiento Independiente Sechura Rumbo al Progreso.
- 1999-2002: Porfirio Idelfonso Ayala Morán, Movimiento Independiente Unidos por el Cambio

== Climate ==
Climate data for Chusis, Sechura, elevation 8 m (26 ft), (1991–2020)
Month	Jan	Feb	Mar	Apr	May	Jun	Jul	Aug	Sep	Oct	Nov	Dec	Year
Mean daily maximum °C (°F)	31.9 (89.4)	32.8 (91.0)	32.7 (90.9)	31.7 (89.1)	29.5 (85.1)	27.2 (81.0)	26.1 (79.0)	26.0 (78.8)	26.7 (80.1)	27.3 (81.1)	28.2 (82.8)	30.1 (86.2)	29.2 (84.5)
Mean daily minimum °C (°F)	21.7 (71.1)	22.9 (73.2)	22.6 (72.7)	21.2 (70.2)	19.7 (67.5)	18.4 (65.1)	17.4 (63.3)	17.1 (62.8)	17.1 (62.8)	17.4 (63.3)	17.9 (64.2)	19.6 (67.3)	19.4 (67.0)
Average precipitation mm (inches)	18.0 (0.71)	15.8 (0.62)	36.2 (1.43)	5.8 (0.23)	0.6 (0.02)	0.1 (0.00)	0.2 (0.01)	0.0 (0.0)	0.0 (0.0)	0.2 (0.01)	0.6 (0.02)	3.1 (0.12)	80.6 (3.17)
Source: National Meteorology and Hydrology Service of Peru

== See also ==
- Administrative divisions of Peru
