= Bella Vista Department =

Bella Vista Department Departamento Bella Vista (Spanish) Tetãvore Vélla Vísta (Guarani)
- Department
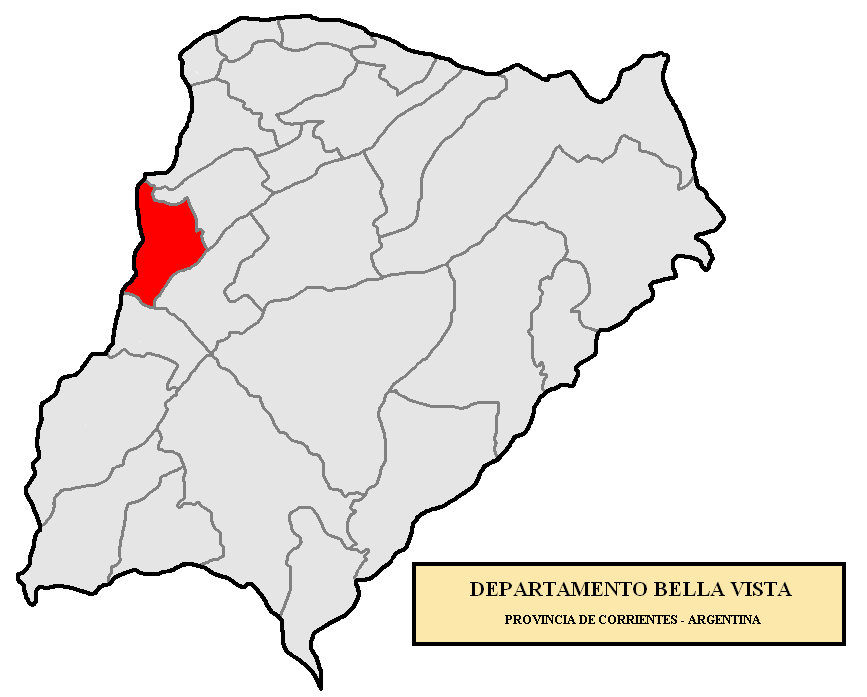
- location of Bella Vista Department in Corrientes Province
- Coordinates: 28°28′S 59°03′W
- Country: Argentina
- Seat: Bella Vista

Area
  - Total: 1,695 km^{2} (654 sq mi)

Population (2001 census [INDEC])
  - Total: 35,350
  - Density: 20.86/km^{2} (54.02/sq mi)
- Demonym: Bellavistense
- Postal Code: W3432
- Area Code: 03777
- Patron saint: Nuestra Señora del Carmen
- Website: www.bellavista.gov.ar

Bella Vista Department is a department of Corrientes Province in Argentina.

The provincial subdivision has a population of about 35,350 inhabitants in an area of 1,695 km^{2} (654 sq mi), and its capital city is Bella Vista, which is located around 891 km (554 mi) from the Capital federal.
