= San Pablo province =

Coordinates: 7°07′S 78°49′W

San Pablo
- Province
- Location of San Pablo in the Cajamarca Region
- Country: Peru
- Region: Cajamarca
- Capital: San Pablo

Government
  - Mayor: Moises Melquiades Gutierrez Cabanillas

Area
  - Total: 672.29 km^{2} (259.57 sq mi)
- Elevation: 2,365 m (7,759 ft)

Population
  - Total: 23,513
  - Density: 34.974/km^{2} (90.584/sq mi)
- UBIGEO: 0612

San Pablo is a province of the Cajamarca Region in Peru. The capital of the province is the city of San Pablo.

== Political division ==
The province measures 672.29 square kilometres (259.57 sq mi) and is divided into four districts:

| District | Mayor |
|---|---|
| San Bernardino | Juan Telmo Tongombol Quispe |
| San Luis | Manuel Fortunato Moncada Cruzado |
| San Pablo | Moises Melquiades Gutierrez Cabanillas |
| Tumbadén | Silverio Tejada |
