= Sechura =

- Town
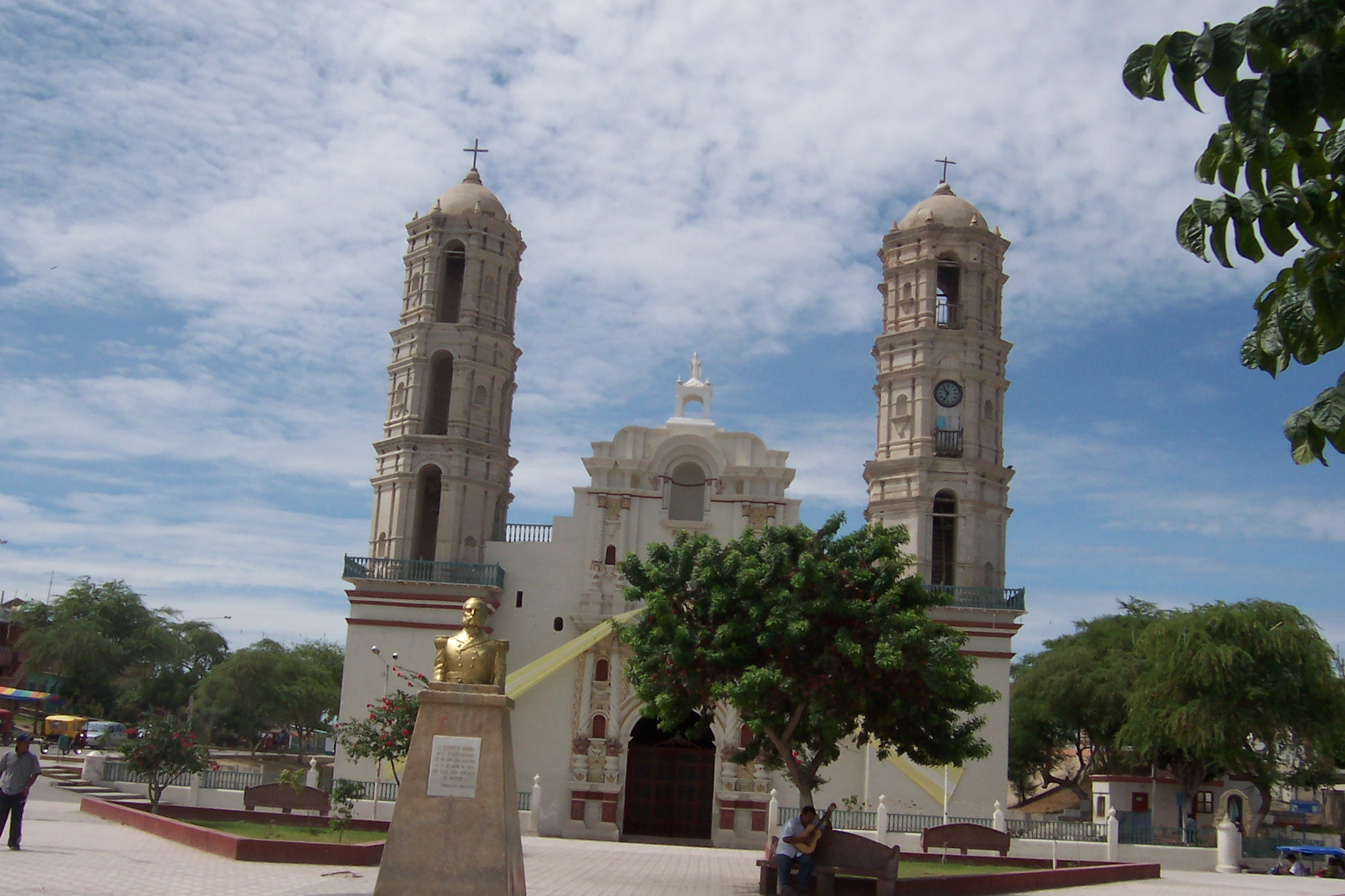
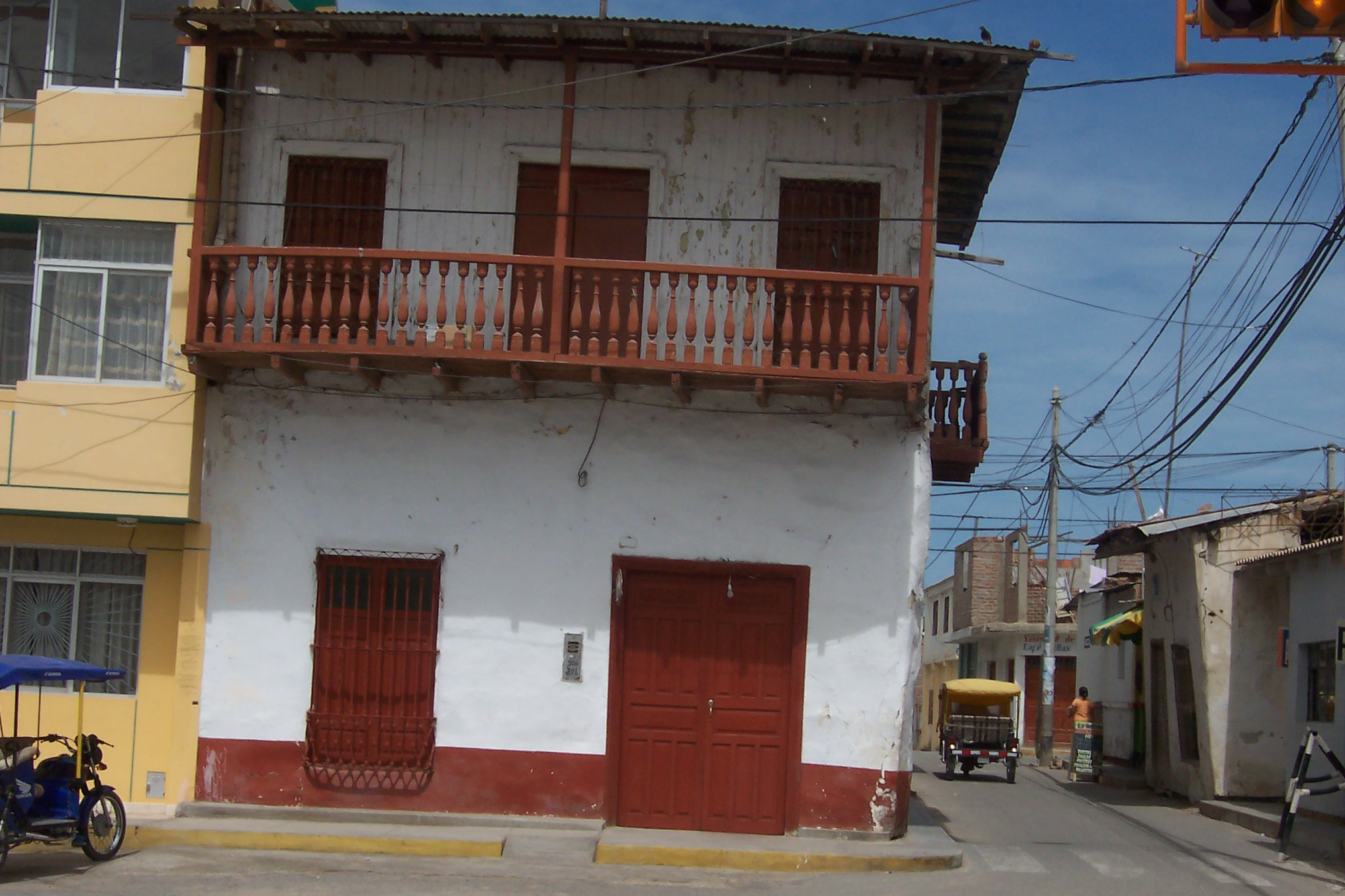
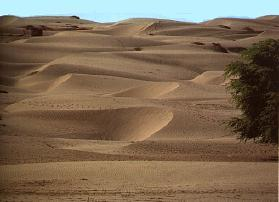

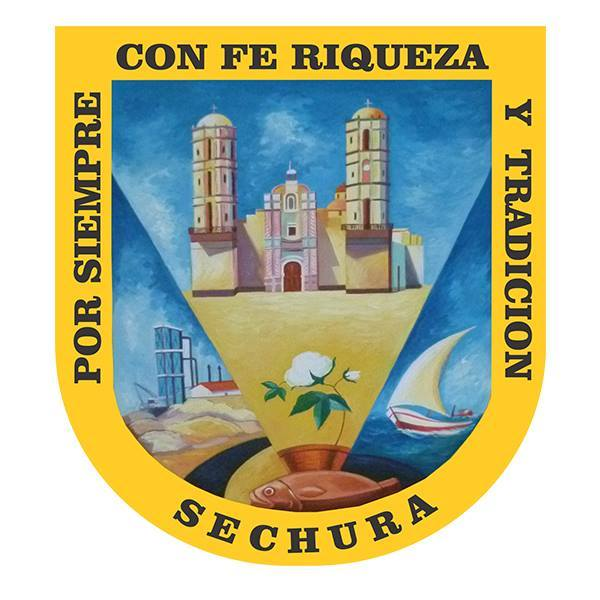
- Flag Coat of arms

- Location within Peru
- Coordinates: 5°33′27.30″S 80°49′20.28″W
- Country: Peru
- Region: Piura
- Province: Sechura
- District: Sechura

Government
  - Mayor: Justo Eche Morales
- Elevation: 11 m (36 ft)

Population
  - Estimate (2015): 44,103
- Time zone: UTC-5 (PET)
- Website: www.munisechura.gob.pe

Sechura is a town in northwestern Peru, 50 km (31 mi) south of Piura. It is the capital of Sechura Province in the Piura Region. The city gives its name to the Sechura Desert, which extends south along most of coastal Peru. Crescent dunes lie south of the city, between the sea and the highway.

The city has a main square with the Catédral de Sechura, built in the 18th century in the Spanish colonial style. Because of the desert surrounding the city, the church has sometimes been called the Catédral de Arena (Sand Cathedral).

== Climate ==
Sechura has a hot desert climate (Köppen: BWh) characterized by high temperatures throughout the year and extremely low precipitation.

December through May marks the hotter part of the year. February, the hottest month, averages daily highs of 33 °C (91 °F) and daily lows of 23 °C (73 °F). In addition, the majority of Sechura's 80 millimetres (3.1 in) of yearly precipitation falls in between January and March.

June to November marks the cooler half of the year, with warm temperatures and negligible rainfall. August, the coolest month, averages daily highs of 26 °C (79 °F) and daily lows of 17 °C (63 °F).

Climate data for Sechura (Chusis), elevation 8 m (26 ft), (1991–2020)
Month	Jan	Feb	Mar	Apr	May	Jun	Jul	Aug	Sep	Oct	Nov	Dec	Year
Mean daily maximum °C (°F)	31.9 (89.4)	32.8 (91.0)	32.7 (90.9)	31.7 (89.1)	29.5 (85.1)	27.2 (81.0)	26.1 (79.0)	26.0 (78.8)	26.7 (80.1)	27.3 (81.1)	28.2 (82.8)	30.1 (86.2)	29.2 (84.6)
Mean daily minimum °C (°F)	21.7 (71.1)	22.9 (73.2)	22.6 (72.7)	21.2 (70.2)	19.7 (67.5)	18.4 (65.1)	17.4 (63.3)	17.1 (62.8)	17.1 (62.8)	17.4 (63.3)	17.9 (64.2)	19.6 (67.3)	19.4 (66.9)
Average precipitation mm (inches)	18.0 (0.71)	15.8 (0.62)	36.2 (1.43)	5.8 (0.23)	0.6 (0.02)	0.1 (0.00)	0.2 (0.01)	0.0 (0.0)	0.0 (0.0)	0.2 (0.01)	0.6 (0.02)	3.1 (0.12)	80.6 (3.17)
Source: NOAA

== See also ==
- Sechura language
