= San Bernardino District, San Pablo =

Coordinates: 7.1684°S 78.8294°W

San Bernardino
- District
- Interactive map of San Bernardino
- Country: Peru
- Region: Cajamarca
- Province: San Pablo
- Founded: December 11, 1981
- Capital: San Bernardino

Government
  - Mayor: Juan Telmo Tongombol Quispe

Area
  - Total: 167.12 km^{2} (64.53 sq mi)
- Elevation: 1,350 m (4,430 ft)

Population (2005 census)
  - Total: 4,606
  - Density: 27.56/km^{2} (71.38/sq mi)
- Time zone: UTC-5 (PET)
- UBIGEO: 061202

San Bernardino District is one of four districts of the province San Pablo in Peru.
