= San Pablo, Cajamarca =

San Pablo
- Town
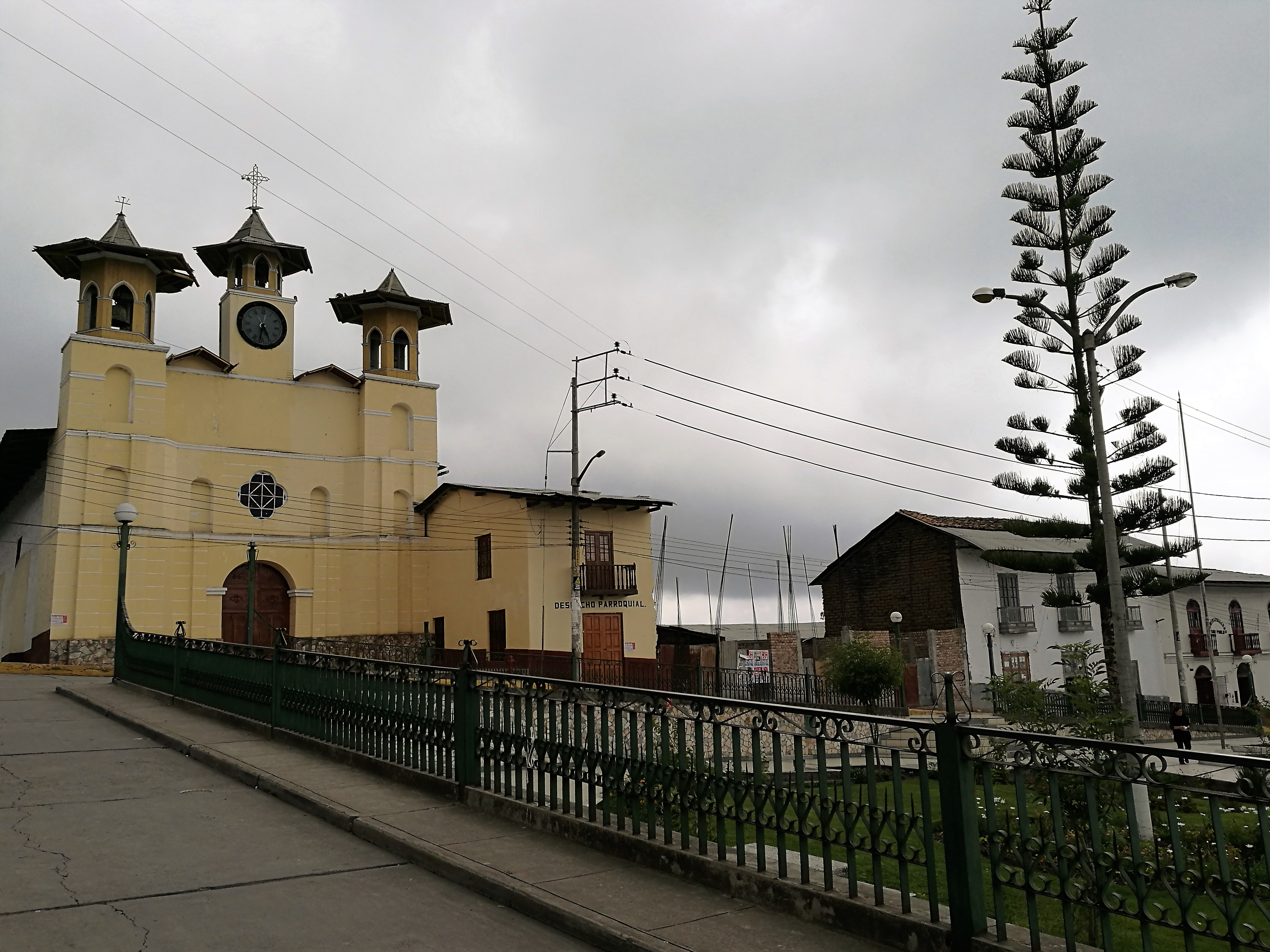

- Location within Peru
- Coordinates: 7°06′54″S 78°49′18″W
- Country: Peru
- Region: Cajamarca
- Province: San Pablo
- District: San Pablo

Government
  - Mayor: Moises Melquiades Gutierrez Cabanillas
- Elevation: 2,365 m (7,759 ft)
- Time zone: UTC-5 (PET)

San Pablo is a town in Northern Peru, capital of the province San Pablo in the region Cajamarca.
