= USS Kangaroo (IX-121) =

History

United States
- Laid down: 28 September 1943
- Launched: 6 November 1943
- Commissioned: 20 December 1943
- Decommissioned: 13 May 1946
- Fate: Disposed of by the Maritime Commission

General characteristics
- Displacement: 3665 tons
- Length: 441 ft 6 in (134.57 m)
- Beam: 56 ft 11 in (17.35 m)
- Draught: 28 ft 4 in (8.64 m)
- Speed: 11 knots
- Complement: 79 officers and men
- Armament: 1 × 5-inch 38 caliber dual purpose gun; 1 × 3 in (76 mm) gun; 8 × 20 mm cannons

The second USS Kangaroo (IX-121), an Armadillo-class tanker designated an unclassified miscellaneous vessel, was the second ship of the United States Navy to be named for the kangaroo, a family of herbivorous, leaping, marsupial mammals of Australia, New Guinea, and adjacent islands. Her keel was laid down as Paul Tulane under Maritime Commission contract (T. Z-ET1-S-C3) by Delta Shipbuilding Company, New Orleans, Louisiana, on 28 September 1943, as a tanker ship for the Liberty Ship program. She was renamed Kangaroo 27 October 1943, launched on 6 November 1943 sponsored by Mrs. Rufus C. Harris, acquired by the Navy on bareboat basis 17 December, and commissioned on 20 December.

== History ==
=== U.S. Navy service ===
Following shakedown in the Gulf of Mexico, Kangaroo departed Guantanamo Bay Naval Base on 24 January 1944, transited the Panama Canal on 28 January, and steamed to Noumea, New Caledonia, arriving 1 March. Assigned to the Service Force Pacific as a replacement for Stag (IX-128), she loaded fuel and supplies and departed for Guadalcanal on 21 March. Upon arrival 26 March, she commenced fueling operations, and for the next five months she replenishing ships in waters of the Solomon Islands.

Departing Tulagi on 10 September, she sailed to the Tonga Islands, received a cargo of fuel oil, and delivered her cargo at Noumea on 5 October. For seven months she served as a shuttle and station tanker, transporting bunker oil from the Fiji Islands and Tonga Islands to bases in the New Hebrides and New Caledonia. After a voyage to New Zealand for repairs, she departed Auckland on 6 June to load fuel oil at American Samoa. Subsequently, she conducted fueling operations in the Solomon Islands, Eniwetok, and the Western Caroline Islands before arriving Buckner Bay, Okinawa, on 14 August to resume duty as a station tanker.

While in the Pacific Kangaroo steamed over 20,000 miles (32,000 kilometers) and hauled more than 38,000,000 gallons (900,000 barrels, 144,000 cubic meters) of fuel oil and hundreds of drums of lubricating oil for fighting ships of the Navy. During her service she refueled more than 80 ships, including ten aircraft carriers, 34 destroyers, 20 troop transports, 12 cargo ships, and numerous merchantmen — not to mention storage barges, oilers, and tank farms.

Kangaroo departed Okinawa on 2 February 1946, for the United States. Transiting the Panama Canal on 9 March, she put into Norfolk, Virginia, on 30 April after a six-week anchorage at Lynnhaven Roads and Hampton Roads. Kangaroo decommissioned on 13 May, and the following day she was turned over to the Maritime Commission for disposal.

=== Post-War service ===
In 1948, she was renamed to Mostank

In 1954, she was renamed to Niborio

In 1957, she was renamed to Andros Seafarer

In 1963, she was renamed to San Pablo

She was scrapped in March 1969 in Taiwan, still bearing the name S.S. San Pablo.
