= Bellavista District, Bellavista =

Coordinates: 7.0403°S 76.5730°W

Bellavista District
- District
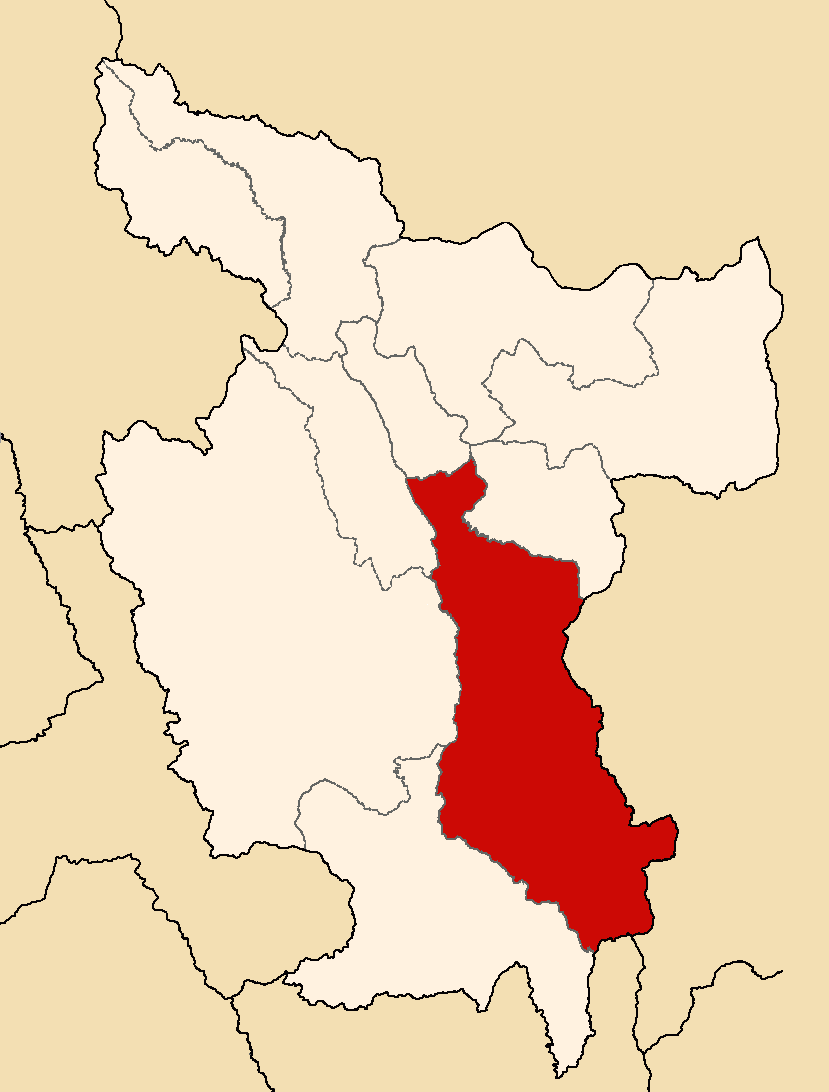
- The Bella Vista province in San Martín
- Interactive map of Bellavista District
- Country: Peru
- Region: San Martín
- Province: Bellavista
- Founded: October 15, 1925
- Capital: Bellavista

Government
  - Mayor: Eduar Guevara Gallardo

Area
  - Total: 287.12 km^{2} (110.86 sq mi)
- Elevation: 287 m (942 ft)

Population (2017)
  - Total: 16,894
  - Density: 58.840/km^{2} (152.39/sq mi)
- Time zone: UTC-5 (PET)
- UBIGEO: 220201

Bellavista District is one of six districts of the province Bellavista in Peru.
