= Bellavista, Bellavista =

Bellavista
- Town
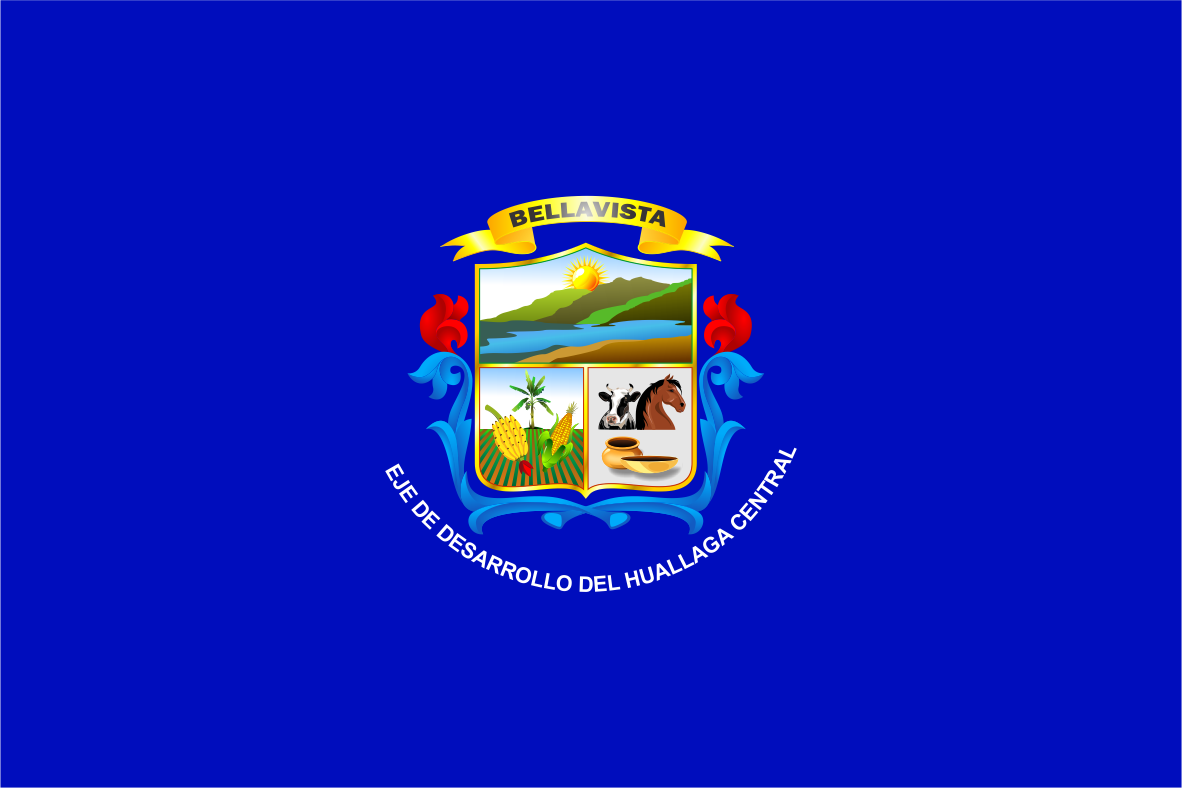

- Location within Peru
- Coordinates: 07°04′00.66″S 76°35′05.10″W
- Country: Peru
- Region: San Martín
- Province: Bellavista
- District: Bellavista

Government
  - Mayor: Eduar Guevara Gallardo
- Elevation: 287 m (942 ft)

Population (2007)
  - Total: 22,116
- Time zone: UTC-5 (PET)

Bellavista is a town in northern Peru, capital of the province Bellavista in the region San Martín. There are 22,116 inhabitants, according to the 2007 census
