= Bellavista de la Unión District =

Coordinates: 5.4405°S 80.7551°W

Bellavista de la Unión
- District
- Interactive map of Bellavista de la Unión
- Country: Peru
- Region: Piura
- Province: Sechura
- Founded: January 29, 1965
- Capital: Bellavista

Government
  - Mayor: Sixto Miguel Chunga Zapata

Area
  - Total: 13.01 km^{2} (5.02 sq mi)
- Elevation: 13 m (43 ft)

Population (2005 census)
  - Total: 3,920
  - Density: 301/km^{2} (780/sq mi)
- Time zone: UTC-5 (PET)
- UBIGEO: 200802

Bellavista de la Unión District is one of six districts of the province Sechura in Peru.

== History ==
Bellavista de la Unión District was created by Law January 29, 1965, in Fernando Belaúnde term.

== Authorities ==
=== Mayors ===
- 2007-2014: Sixto Miguel Chunga Zapata, Agro Si.
- 2003-2006: Tulio Alcides Ramos Chunga, Bellavista al Futuro.
- 1999-2002: Félix Cherre Bayona, Unica San Clemente.

== See also ==
- Administrative divisions of Peru
