= Bellavista province =

Coordinates: 7.06685°S 76.58475°W

Bellavista
- Province
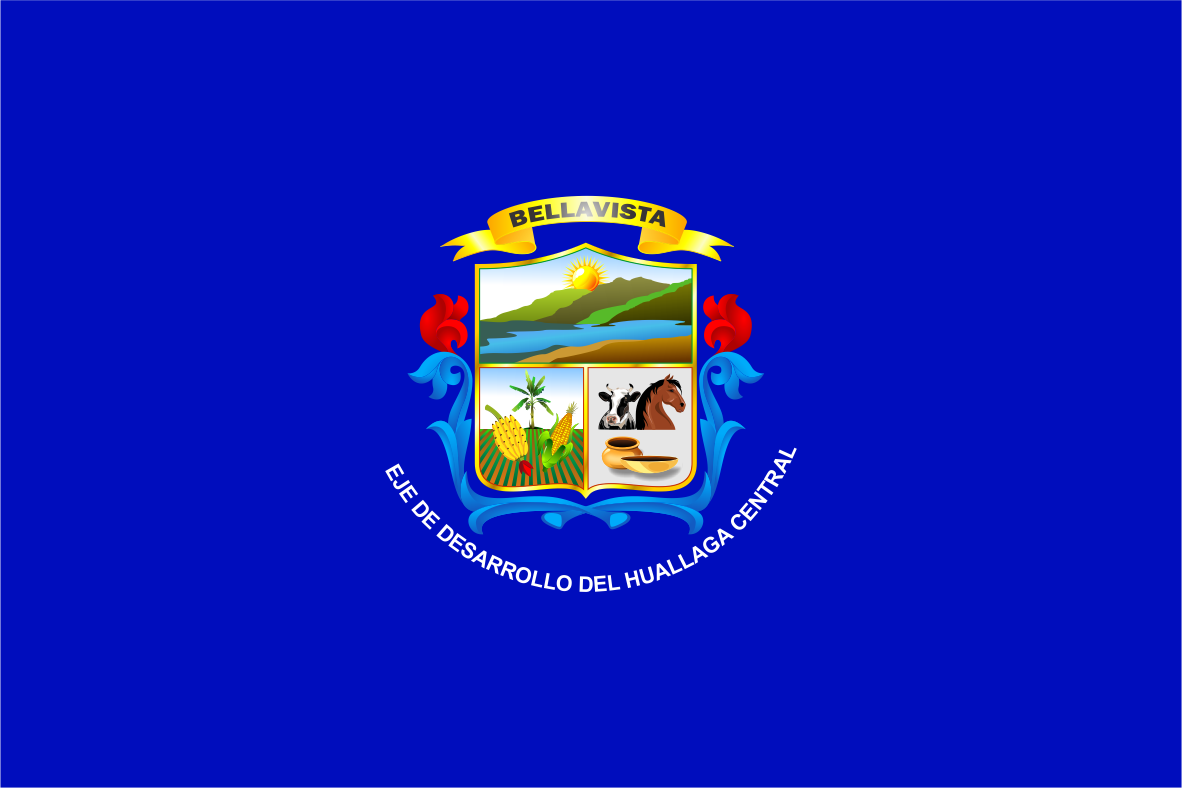
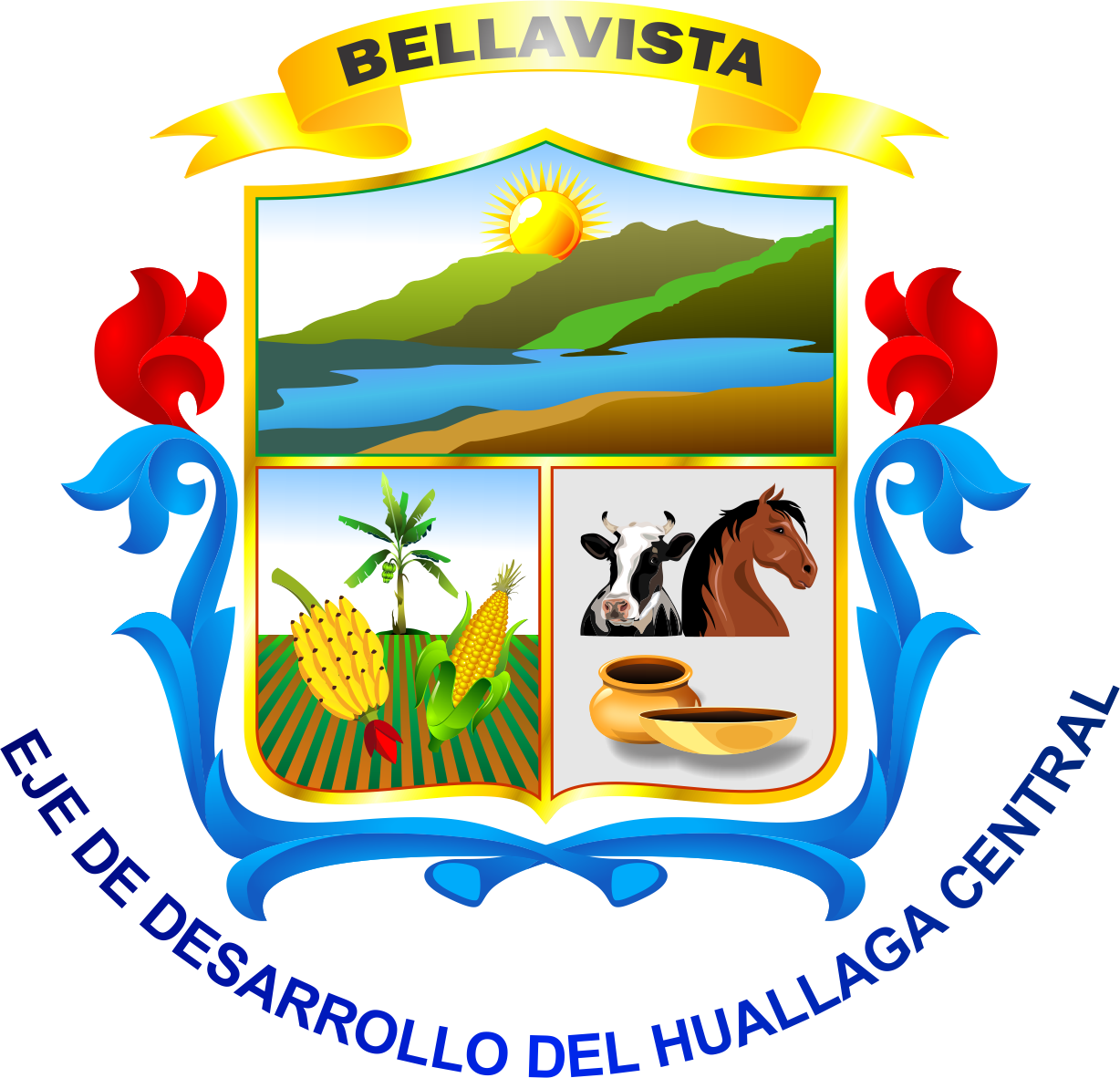
- Flag Coat of arms

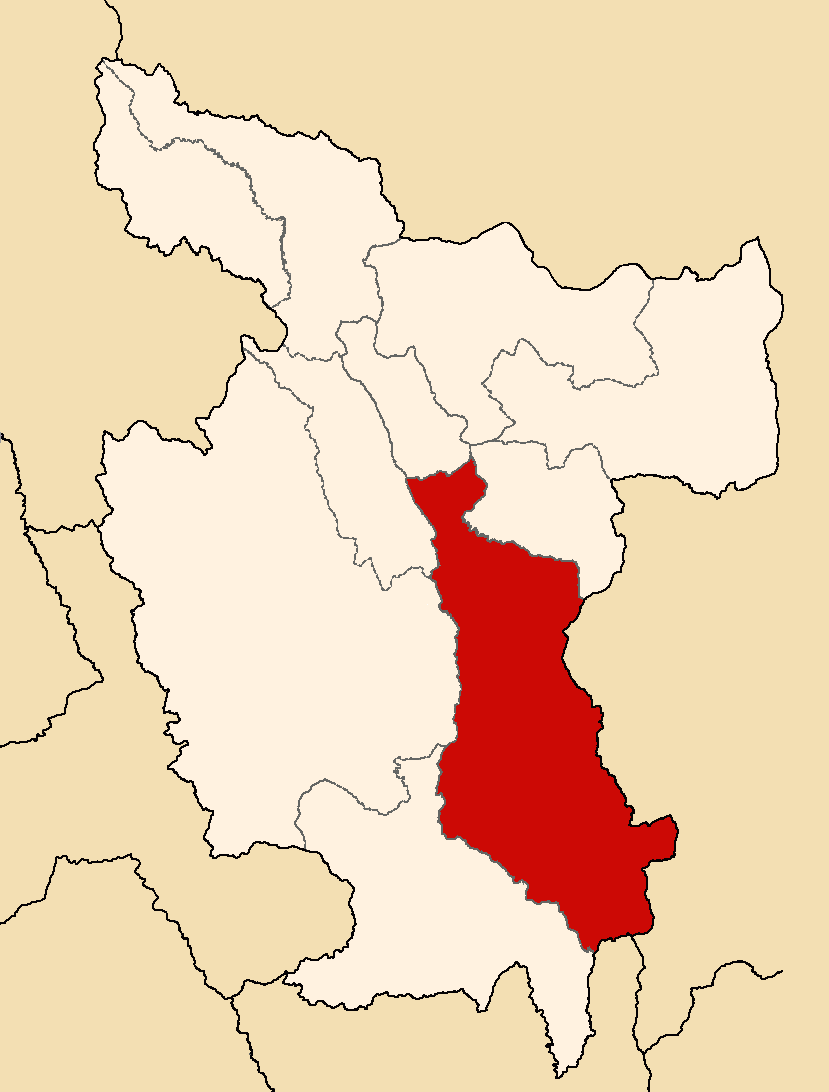
- Location of Bellavista in the San Martín Region
- Country: Peru
- Region: San Martín
- Capital: Bellavista

Government
  - Mayor: Eduar Guevara Gallardo

Area
  - Total: 8,050.9 km^{2} (3,108.5 sq mi)

Population
  - Total: 55,033
  - Density: 6.8356/km^{2} (17.704/sq mi)
- UBIGEO: 2202

Bellavista is one of ten provinces of the San Martín Region in northern Peru.

It was created on 31 May 1984.

== Political division ==
The province is divided into six districts.

- Alto Biavo (Cuzco)
- Bajo Biavo (Nuevo Lima)
- Bellavista (Bellavista)
- Huallaga (Ledoy)
- San Pablo (San Pablo)
- San Rafael (San Rafael)
