= Girolamo Bellavista =

Italian politician (1908–1976)

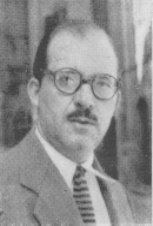
Girolamo Bellavista

Girolamo Bellavista (22 November 1908 – 28 April 1976) was an Italian politician belonging to the Italian Liberal Party. In 1946 he was elected member of the Constituent Assembly of Italy.

Bellavista was born in Palermo. In 1948 he was elected a member of the Chamber of Deputies.
