= Alto Biavo District =

Coordinates: 7.2552°S 76.4759°W

Alto Biavo
- District
- Interactive map of Alto Biavo
- Country: Peru
- Region: San Martín
- Province: Bellavista
- Founded: January 5, 1945
- Capital: Cuzco

Government
  - Mayor: Luis Francisco Muzurrieta Yupanqui

Area
  - Total: 6,117.12 km^{2} (2,361.83 sq mi)
- Elevation: 225 m (738 ft)

Population (2005 census)
  - Total: 5,396
  - Density: 0.8821/km^{2} (2.285/sq mi)
- Time zone: UTC-5 (PET)
- UBIGEO: 220202

Alto Biavo District is one of six districts of the province Bellavista in Peru.

== Climate ==
Climate data for Jose Olaya, Alto Biavo, elevation 282 m (925 ft), (1991–2020)
Month	Jan	Feb	Mar	Apr	May	Jun	Jul	Aug	Sep	Oct	Nov	Dec	Year
Mean daily maximum °C (°F)	33.7 (92.7)	32.9 (91.2)	32.2 (90.0)	32.2 (90.0)	32.3 (90.1)	32.1 (89.8)	32.3 (90.1)	33.5 (92.3)	33.6 (92.5)	33.4 (92.1)	33.5 (92.3)	33.4 (92.1)	32.9 (91.3)
Mean daily minimum °C (°F)	20.7 (69.3)	20.6 (69.1)	20.6 (69.1)	20.6 (69.1)	20.5 (68.9)	19.8 (67.6)	19.2 (66.6)	19.3 (66.7)	19.7 (67.5)	20.5 (68.9)	20.7 (69.3)	20.8 (69.4)	20.3 (68.5)
Average precipitation mm (inches)	81.5 (3.21)	114.3 (4.50)	137.7 (5.42)	96.9 (3.81)	93.3 (3.67)	54.6 (2.15)	52.1 (2.05)	45.4 (1.79)	75.7 (2.98)	95.4 (3.76)	114.2 (4.50)	101.9 (4.01)	1,063 (41.85)
Source: National Meteorology and Hydrology Service of Peru
