= Bella Vista =

Bella Vista (Spanish and Italian for "beautiful sight") is the name of several places in the world:

== Places ==
=== Argentina ===
- Bella Vista, Buenos Aires
- Bella Vista, Corrientes
- Bella Vista, Tucumán

=== Australia ===
- Bella Vista, New South Wales, a suburb of Sydney
  - Bella Vista (homestead), a farm and homestead that pre-dates the suburb
  - Bella Vista railway station, a Sydney metro station

=== Belize ===
- Bella Vista, Belize

=== Bolivia ===
- Bella Vista, Beni

=== Canada ===
- Bella Vista (Cumberland), a neighbourhood of Cumberland, Ottawa, Ontario

=== Dominican Republic ===
- Bella Vista, Dominican Republic, a neighborhood of Santo Domingo

=== India ===
- Bella Vista, Hyderabad

=== Mexico ===
- Bella Vista Municipality, Chiapas

=== Panama ===
- Bella Vista, Chiriquí
- Bella Vista, Panama City

=== Paraguay ===
- Bella Vista, Amambay, a frontier town on Paraguayan-Brazilian border
- Bella Vista, Itapúa

=== Peru ===
- Bella Vista, Loreto Region, Maynas; see Napo River

=== South Africa ===
- Bella Vista, Western Cape

=== United States ===
- Bella Vista, Arkansas
- Bella Vista, California, in Shasta County
- Bella Vista, Pennsylvania, a place in Lycoming County, Pennsylvania
- Bella Vista, Philadelphia, Pennsylvania, a neighborhood
- Bella Vista High School, in Fair Oaks, California

=== Uruguay ===
- Bella Vista, Montevideo, one of the "barrios" of Montevideo
- Bella Vista, Maldonado, a village in Maldonado Department
- Bella Vista, Paysandú, a village in Paysandú Department, Uruguay

== Sport ==
- Bella Vista de Bahía Blanca, an Argentine football club
- Club Atlético Bella Vista, a Uruguayan football club

== See also ==
- Bela Vista
- Bellavista (disambiguation)
- Belle Vista, Georgia
