= Bellavista Airport (Chile) =

- IATA: none; ICAO: SCBV

Summary
- Airport type: Public
- Serves: Río Claro, Chile
- Elevation AMSL: 885 ft / 270 m
- Coordinates: 35°11′10″S 71°17′45″W

Map
- Location of Bellavista Airport in Chile

Runways
| Direction | Length | | Surface |
| Direction | m | ft | Surface |
|---|---|---|---|
| 01/19 | 800 | 2,625 | Asphalt |
- Source: Landings.com Google Maps GCM

Bellavista Airport (Spanish: Aeropuerto de Bellavista, (ICAO: SCBV)) is an airport serving Río Claro, a commune in the Maule Region of Chile. The airport is 7 kilometres (4.3 mi) south of Molina.

The Curico VOR-DME (Ident: ICO) is 13.5 nautical miles (25.0 km) north of the airport.

== See also ==
- Transport in Chile
- List of airports in Chile
