= San Luis District, San Pablo =

Coordinates: 7.1573°S 78.8686°W

San Luis District Distrito de San Luis
- District
- Interactive map of San Luis District
- Country: Peru
- Region: Cajamarca
- Province: San Pablo
- Founded: December 11, 1981
- Capital: San Luis Grande

Government
  - Mayor: Manuel Fortunato Moncada Cruzado

Area
  - Total: 42.88 km^{2} (16.56 sq mi)
- Elevation: 1,350 m (4,430 ft)

Population (2005 census)
  - Total: 1,524
  - Density: 35.54/km^{2} (92.05/sq mi)
- Time zone: UTC-5 (PET)
- UBIGEO: 061203

San Luis District is the smallest of four districts of the province San Pablo in Peru.
