= San Pablo River (Ecuador) =

River of Ecuador

Location
- Country: Ecuador

The San Pablo River is a river of Ecuador.

== See also ==
- List of rivers of Ecuador
