= San Pablo District, Bellavista =

Coordinates: 6.8123°S 76.5766°W

San Pablo District
- District
- Interactive map of San Pablo District
- Country: Peru
- Region: San Martín
- Province: Bellavista
- Founded: January 5, 1945
- Capital: San Pablo

Government
  - Mayor: Angel Diaz Julian

Area
  - Total: 362.49 km^{2} (139.96 sq mi)
- Elevation: 250 m (820 ft)

Population (2005 census)
  - Total: 9,459
  - Density: 26.09/km^{2} (67.58/sq mi)
- Time zone: UTC-5 (PET)
- UBIGEO: 220205

San Pablo District is one of six districts of the province Bellavista in Peru.

== Climate ==
Climate data for San Pablo, elevation 270 m (890 ft), (1991–2020)
Month	Jan	Feb	Mar	Apr	May	Jun	Jul	Aug	Sep	Oct	Nov	Dec	Year
Mean daily maximum °C (°F)	33.3 (91.9)	32.7 (90.9)	32.1 (89.8)	32.0 (89.6)	32.0 (89.6)	31.9 (89.4)	32.2 (90.0)	33.4 (92.1)	33.6 (92.5)	33.5 (92.3)	33.5 (92.3)	33.2 (91.8)	32.8 (91.0)
Mean daily minimum °C (°F)	21.6 (70.9)	21.6 (70.9)	21.7 (71.1)	21.6 (70.9)	21.2 (70.2)	20.6 (69.1)	20.0 (68.0)	20.1 (68.2)	20.7 (69.3)	21.5 (70.7)	21.7 (71.1)	21.7 (71.1)	21.2 (70.1)
Average precipitation mm (inches)	79.1 (3.11)	104.8 (4.13)	147.2 (5.80)	118.6 (4.67)	78.5 (3.09)	61.9 (2.44)	55.9 (2.20)	65.0 (2.56)	96.4 (3.80)	123.6 (4.87)	117.4 (4.62)	95.7 (3.77)	1,144.1 (45.06)
Source: National Meteorology and Hydrology Service of Peru
