= San Pablo, Nariño =

Coordinates: 1.6725°N 77.0139°W

San Pablo
- Municipality and town
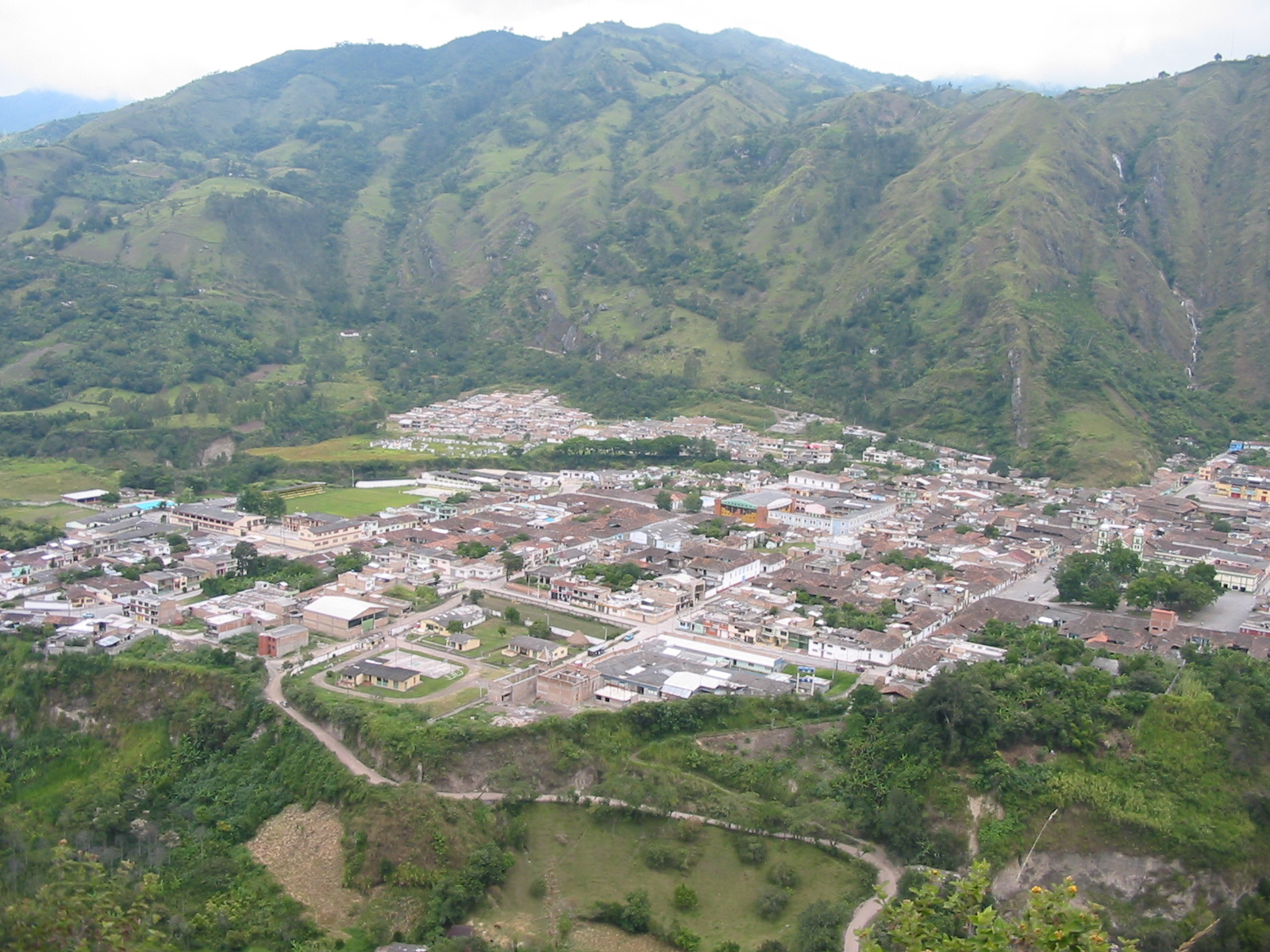
- View of San Pablo, Nariño

- Flag Coat of arms

- Location of the municipality and town of San Pablo in the Nariño Department of Colombia.
- Country: Colombia
- Department: Nariño Department

Area
  - Total: 1,977 km^{2} (763 sq mi)

Population (Census 2018)
  - Total: 12,929
  - Density: 6.540/km^{2} (16.94/sq mi)
- Time zone: UTC-5 (Colombia Standard Time)

San Pablo is a town and municipality in the Nariño Department, Colombia.
