= San Pablo District, San Pablo =

District in San Pablo, Peru

Coordinates: 7.1130°S 78.8184°W

San Pablo
- District
- Interactive map of San Pablo
- Country: Peru
- Region: Cajamarca
- Province: San Pablo
- Capital: San Pablo

Government
  - Mayor: Moises Melquiades Gutierrez Cabanillas

Area
  - Total: 197.92 km^{2} (76.42 sq mi)
- Elevation: 2,365 m (7,759 ft)

Population (2005 census)
  - Total: 13,479
  - Density: 68.103/km^{2} (176.39/sq mi)
- Time zone: UTC-5 (PET)
- UBIGEO: 061201

San Pablo District is one of four districts of the province San Pablo in Peru. The population in 2005 was 13479.
