= San Pablo District, Mariscal Ramón Castilla =

Coordinates: 3.4511°S 72.8678°W

San Pablo District
- District
- Interactive map of San Pablo District
- Country: Peru
- Region: Loreto
- Province: Mariscal Ramón Castilla
- Founded: October 19, 1993
- Capital: San Pablo de Loreto

Area
  - Total: 5,045.58 km^{2} (1,948.11 sq mi)
- Elevation: 95 m (312 ft)

Population (2005 census)
  - Total: 14,642
  - Density: 2.9019/km^{2} (7.5160/sq mi)
- Time zone: UTC-5 (PET)
- UBIGEO: 160404

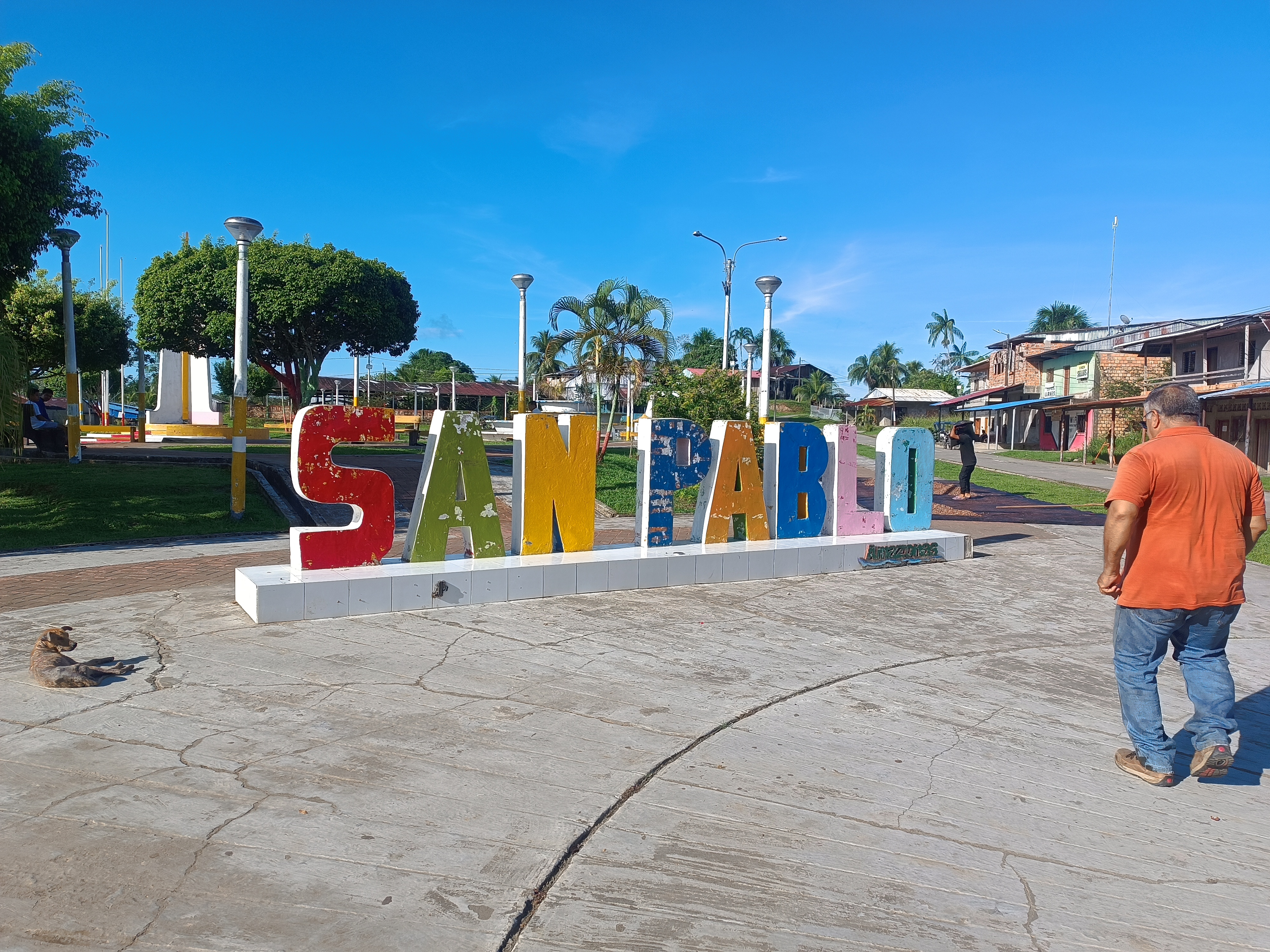
Entrance to San Pablo

San Pablo District is one of four districts of the province Mariscal Ramón Castilla in Peru.
