= San Pablo, Isabela =

Municipality in Isabela, Philippines

San Pablo Cabagan Viejo
- Municipality
- Municipality of San Pablo
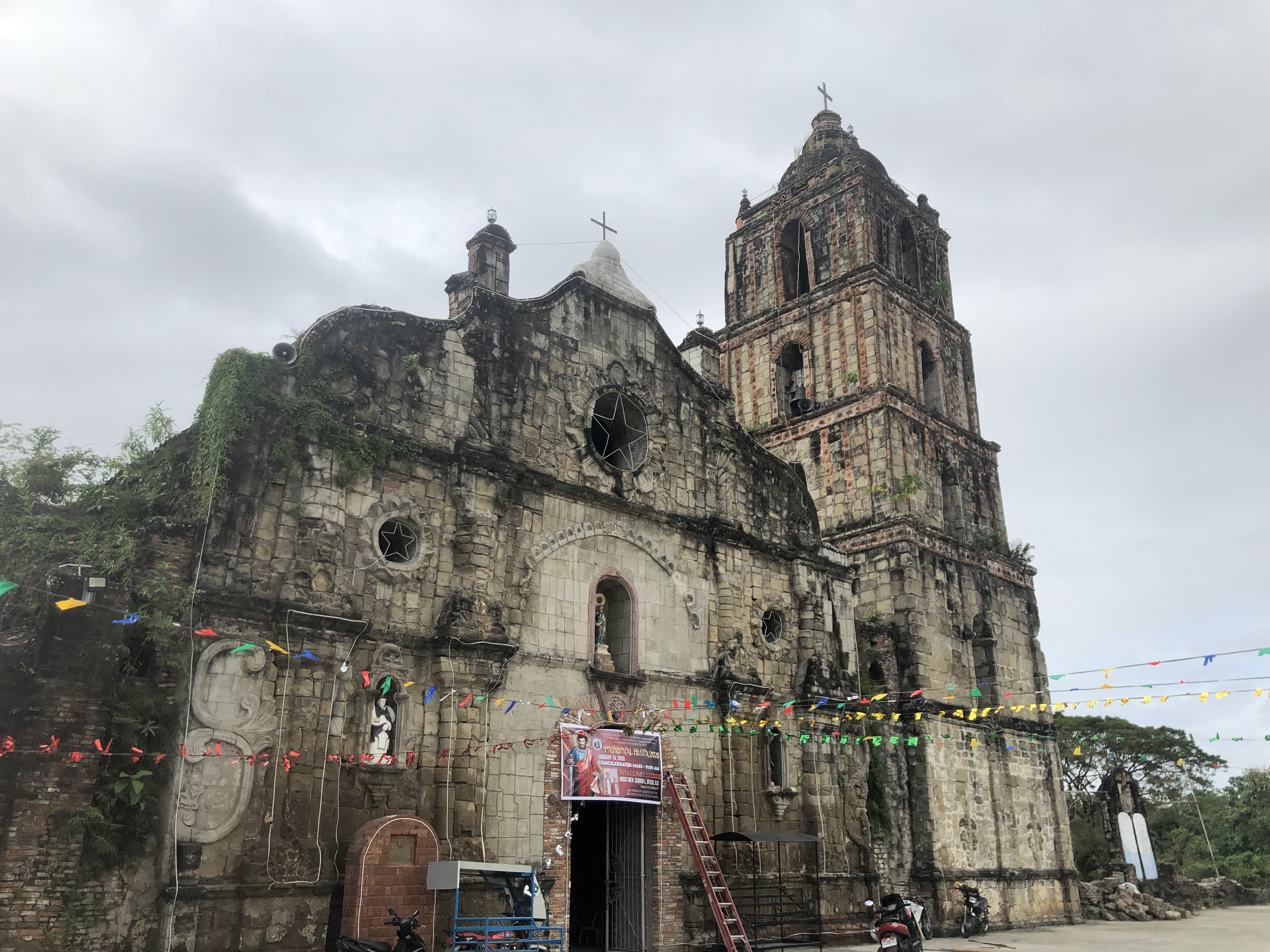
- San Pablo de Cabagan Church, a declared National Cultural Treasure

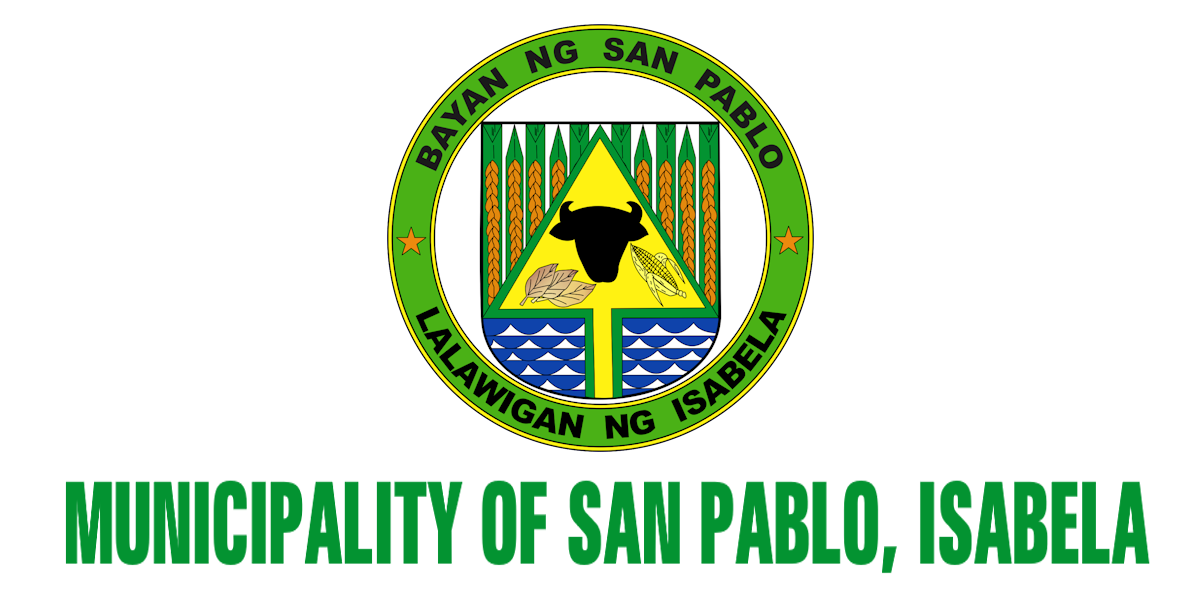
- Flag Seal

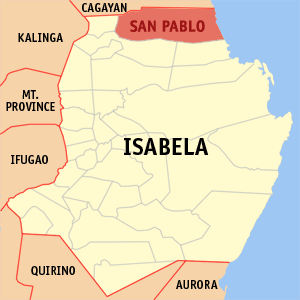
- Map of Isabela with San Pablo highlighted
- Interactive map of San Pablo
- Location within the Philippines
- Coordinates: 17°26′52″N 121°47′42″E
- Country: Philippines
- Region: Cagayan Valley
- Province: Isabela
- District: 1st district
- Established: January 1, 1910 (as San Pablo)
- Named for: St. Paul the Apostle
- Barangays: 17 (see Barangays)

Government
  - Type: Sangguniang Bayan
  - Mayor: Antonio N. Miro, Jr.
  - Vice Mayor: Antonio Jose T. Miro III
  - Representative: Antonio T. Albano
  - Electorate: 17,489 voters (2025)

Area
  - Total: 637.90 km^{2} (246.29 sq mi)
- Elevation: 41 m (135 ft)
- Highest elevation: 168 m (551 ft)
- Lowest elevation: 14 m (46 ft)

Population (2024 census)
  - Total: 26,462
  - Density: 41.483/km^{2} (107.44/sq mi)
  - Households: 5,867

Economy
  - Income class: 1st municipal income class
  - Poverty incidence: 19.09% (2023)
  - Revenue: ₱ 272.5 million (2024)
  - Assets: ₱ 657.9 million (2024)
  - Expenditure: ₱ 235.6 million (2024)
  - Liabilities: ₱ 81.18 million (2024)

Service provider
  - Electricity: Isabela 2 Electric Cooperative (ISELCO 2)
- Time zone: UTC+8 (PST)
- ZIP code: 3329
- PSGC: 0203133000
- IDD : area code: +63 (0)78
- Native languages: Ibanag; Ilocano; Tagalog
- Website: www.sanpablo-isabela.gov.ph

San Pablo, officially the Municipality of San Pablo (Ibanag: Ili nat San Pablo; Ilocano: Ili ti San Pablo; Tagalog: Bayan ng San Pablo), is a municipality in the province of Isabela, Philippines. According to the 2024 census, it has a population of 26,462 people.

== History ==
=== Spanish occupation ===
San Pablo is the oldest pueblo in the Province of Isabela. The town was founded on 1646 as Maquila by Fr. Pedro de Santo Tomas, making it the oldest town in Isabela and existing before the province's creation. The original name literally means sparkling. It was then renamed to Cabagan, loosely interpreted as the place where people wear "ba-ag" when the Spaniards arrived at the Philippine Islands.

Mengal Baladdon and his troops, disturbed by Fray Pedro Jimenez's success in establishing Christian communities in the Irraya, devastated Cabagan in 1683, killing twelve people and forcing the locals to escape to the mountains. The hamlet was on the point of collapse when the alcalde-mayor of Cagayan rescued it by killing some accomplices and capturing seventy. Their property was confiscated and given to the army.

In 1709, a fire destroyed the Cabagan Church and the convent.

=== American occupation ===
In the 1900s, Cabagan was subdivided into three divisions, namely: Cabagan Viejo, Cabagan Nuevo, and Santa Maria. Cabagan Viejo was then renamed to San Pablo, after its patron saint Paul the Apostle whose feast day is celebrated every January 15. Meanwhile, Cabagan Nuevo became the modern-day Cabagan, while Santa Maria retained its name.

=== Japanese occupation ===
The seat of administration for San Pablo town was moved to Barrio Auitan in 1944, then to Barrio Minanga at the request of the Japanese.

=== Philippine independence ===
In 1959, Mayor Calixtro B. Cauan returned the government center to its former location, which is now the current location.

== Geography ==
San Pablo is situated 47.12 kilometres (29.28 mi) from the provincial capital Ilagan, and 476.04 kilometres (295.80 mi) from the country's capital city of Manila.

=== Barangays ===
San Pablo is politically subdivided into 17 barangays. Each barangay consists of puroks while some have sitios.

- Annanuman
- Auitan
- Ballacayu
- Binguang (Baculud)
- Bungad
- Dalena
- Caddangan (Limbauan)
- Calamagui
- Caralucud
- Guminga
- Minanga Norte
- Minanga Sur
- San Jose
- Poblacion
- Simanu Norte
- Simanu Sur
- Tupa (San Vicente)

=== Climate ===
Climate data for San Pablo, Isabela
Month	Jan	Feb	Mar	Apr	May	Jun	Jul	Aug	Sep	Oct	Nov	Dec	Year
Mean daily maximum °C (°F)	29 (84)	30 (86)	32 (90)	35 (95)	35 (95)	35 (95)	34 (93)	33 (91)	32 (90)	31 (88)	30 (86)	28 (82)	32 (90)
Mean daily minimum °C (°F)	19 (66)	20 (68)	21 (70)	23 (73)	23 (73)	24 (75)	23 (73)	23 (73)	23 (73)	22 (72)	21 (70)	20 (68)	22 (71)
Average precipitation mm (inches)	31.2 (1.23)	23 (0.9)	27.7 (1.09)	28.1 (1.11)	113.5 (4.47)	141.4 (5.57)	176.4 (6.94)	236.6 (9.31)	224.9 (8.85)	247.7 (9.75)	222.9 (8.78)	178 (7.0)	1,651.4 (65)
Average rainy days	10	6	5	5	13	12	15	15	15	17	16	15	144
Source: World Weather Online

== Demographics ==
Population census of San Pablo

Year	Pop.	±% p.a.
1903	3,899	—
1918	4,994	+1.66%
1939	6,241	+1.07%
1948	5,700	−1.00%
1960	8,349	+3.23%
1970	11,539	+3.28%
1975	12,402	+1.46%
1980	13,764	+2.11%

Year	Pop.	±% p.a.
1990	16,680	+1.94%
1995	17,122	+0.49%
2000	19,090	+2.36%
2007	20,561	+1.03%
2010	22,040	+2.56%
2015	25,384	+2.73%
2020	26,320	+0.77%
2024	26,462	+0.13%

Source: Philippine Statistics Authority

In the 2024 census, the population of San Pablo was 26,462 people, with a density of 41 inhabitants per square kilometre or 110 inhabitants per square mile.

== Economy ==
Poverty incidence of San Pablo (%)

Source: Philippine Statistics Authority

== Culture ==
The Baka (Cow) Festival, inaugurated in 2004, is held annually on January 15.

== Government ==
=== Local government ===
As a municipality in the Province of Isabela, government officials at the provincial and municipal levels are voted by the town. The provincial government has political jurisdiction over most local transactions of the municipal government.

The municipality of San Pablo is governed by a mayor, designated as its local chief executive, and by a municipal council as its legislative body in accordance with the Local Government Code. The mayor, vice mayor, and the municipal councilors are elected directly in polls held every three years.

Barangays are also headed by elected officials: Barangay Captain, Barangay Council, whose members are called Barangay Councilors. The barangays have SK federation which represents the barangay, headed by SK chairperson and whose members are called SK councilors. All officials are also elected every three years.

=== Elected officials ===
Members of the San Pablo Municipal Council (2022-2025)
Position	Name
District Representative	Antonio T. Albano
Municipal Mayor	Antonio N. Miro Jr.
Municipal Vice-Mayor	Antonio Jose T. Miro III
Municipal Councilors	Jannina P. Rance
Municipal Councilors	Roman Sebastian S. Lim-Gollayan
Municipal Councilors	Cherry S. Cureg
Municipal Councilors	William Carl C. Valdepeñas
Municipal Councilors	Samson B. Cammayo
Municipal Councilors	Mark Joseff Serrano
Municipal Councilors	Allan C. Malayao
Municipal Councilors	Leo Yule C. Balabbo

==== Past chief executives ====
According to accessible documents, the three Capitan Municipals of San Pablo served in the latter half of Spanish administration when Cabagan Viejo was re-established. These were the Municipal Presidents during the American period.

- Don Juan S. Gollayan (1884-1889)
- Don Salvador Cauan (1890-1895)
- Don Agripino Cammayo (1896-1899)
- Don Antonio Pagulayan (1900-1903)
- Don Thomas Gollayan (19041907)
- Don Ventura Santos Guzman (1908-1910)
- Don Salvador Tumaliuan (19111914)
- Don Agustin Miro (1915-1918)
- Don Angel Cammayo (1919-1922)
- Don Valeriano Palattao (1923-1925)
- Don Anacleto Pagulayan (1926-1931)
- Don Antonio Cauan (1932-1936)
- Don Agustin Mesa (1937-1938)

San Pablo's municipal mayors during the Commonwealth period, Japanese occupation, and the Third Republic include

- Hon. Manuel Masigan (1938–1940)
- Hon. Marciano Nolasco Castañeda (1941-1942 and 1945-1946)
- Hon. Melecio Antonio (1942–1943 appointed)
- Hon. Jose Guzman (1943–1944 appointed)
- Hon. Jesus Gollayan (1946–1947 appointed)
- Hon. Jose L. Tumaliuan (1948–1950)
- Hon. Hon. Aniceto Palattao (born 1951)
- Calixtro B. Cauan (1952-1955, 1956-1959 and 1960-1963)
- Hon. Cayetano N. Cauan (1964-1967, 1968-1971, 1972-1980, and 1980–1986)

These were the municipal mayors during the Fifth Republic, under the 1987 constitution:

- Hon. Antonio N. Miro, Jr. (1986-1987 OIC, 2004-2007, 2007-2010, 2010-2013, and 2016–present)
- Hon. Roy Umayam (1987–1988)
- Hon. Cayetano A. Cauan, Jr. (1988-1992; 1992-1995)
- Hon. Edwardson B. Tumaliuan (1995-1998, 1998-2001)
- Hon. Celia M. Aragon (2001–2004)
- Hon. Antonio Jose T. Miro III (2013–2016).

=== Congress representation ===
San Pablo, belonging to the first legislative district of the province of Isabela, currently represented by Hon. Antonio T. Albano.

== Education ==
The Schools Division of Isabela governs the town's public education system. The division office is a field office of the DepEd in Cagayan Valley region. The San Pablo Schools District Office governs the public and private elementary and high schools throughout the municipality.

=== Primary and elementary schools ===
- Annanuman Elementary School
- Auitan Elementary School
- Ballacayu Elementary School
- Binguang Elementary School
- Bungad Elementary School
- Caddangan Primary School
- Calamagui Elementary School
- Caralucud Primary School
- Dalena Elementary School
- Limbauan Elementary School
- Minanga Elementary School
- San Jose Elementary School
- San Pablo Central School
- San Vicente Elementary School
- Simanu Norte Elementary School
- Simanu Sur Elementary School

=== Secondary schools ===
- Dalena High School
- San Pablo National High School
- Simanu National High School
- Saint MICS Achievers Center
- St. Paul Vocational and Industrial High School
