= San Paolo =

San Paolo (Italian for Saint Paul) may refer to:

== Municipalities in Italy ==
- San Paolo, Lombardy, a municipality in Lombardy, Italy
- San Paolo Albanese, village and comune in the province of Potenza, in the Basilicata region of southern Italy
- San Paolo d'Argon, a municipality in Lombardy, Italy
- San Paolo Bel Sito, a municipality in the Metropolitan City of Naples in the Italian region of Campania
- San Paolo d'Argon
- San Paolo di Civitate
- San Paolo di Jesi
- San Paolo Solbrito

== Churches ==
- San Paolo, Fiastra, a church in Fiastra, Marche, Italy
- San Paolo, Imbersago, a church in Imbersago, province of Lecco, region of Lombardy, Italy
- San Paolo, Mirabello, a church in Mirabello, Ferrara, Italy
- San Paolo, Parma, former convent in Parma, Emilia-Romagna, Italy
- San Paolo, Pistoia, a church in Pistoia, Tuscany, Italy
- Basilica di San Paolo fuori le Mura, a church in Rome, Italy
- San Paolo della Croce, church in the suburbs of Rome, Italy
- San Paolo a Ripa d'Arno, church in Pisa, region of Tuscany, Italy
- San Paolo alle Tre Fontane, church in Rome, Italy

== Various ==
- Intesa Sanpaolo, bank of Turin and the major bank of Italy
- Stadio San Paolo, a stadium in Campania
- São Paulo, in Brazil
- San Paolo (isle), small island on Lake Iseo in Brescia, Northern Italy
- San Paolo Island, small island near Taranto, part of the Cheradi Islands, Southern Italy

== See also ==
- San Paolo Apostolo (disambiguation)
- San Paolo Maggiore (disambiguation)
- Saint Paul (disambiguation)
- São Paulo (disambiguation)
