= Saint Paul (disambiguation) =

Saint Paul most commonly refers to:

- Paul the Apostle (c. 5 – c. 64/65), Christian religious leader
  - Saint Paul, Minnesota, the capital city of the U.S. state of Minnesota named after him

Saint Paul may also refer to:

== People ==
=== Politicians ===
- Fritz Robert Saint-Paul, Haitian judge and politician

=== Martyr saints ===
- Paul (d. ca. 362), Roman martyr; see John and Paul
- Paul (3rd century), one of a group of four martyrs; see Peter, Andrew, Paul, and Denise
- Paul, of Helladius, Crescentius, Paul and Dioscorides, a group of four martyrs killed in 326
- Paul and Ninety Companions (died 1240), Dominican martyrs
- Paul Chong Hasang of the Korean Martyrs (19th century)
- Paul Hanh, Paul Khoan Khan Pham, Paul Loc Van Le, Paul Tinh Boa Le, Paul Tong Buong, and Paul Duong of the Vietnamese Martyrs (18th and 19th centuries)

=== Other saints ===
- Paul of Narbonne (3rd century)
- Paul the Simple (d. ca. 339), Egyptian saint
- Paul of Tammah (died 415), Egyptian saint
- Paul of Thebes (c. 220–341), Egyptian saint, regarded as the first Christian hermit
- Paul Aurelian (6th century), one of the seven founder saints of Brittany
- Paul I, (700-767), Pope
- Paul of Xeropotamou (9th century), founder of Agiou Pavlou monastery on Mount Athos in Greece
- Paul of Latrus (died c. 956), Greek hermit
- Paul VI, born Giovanni Battista Montini (1897-1978), Pope

=== People nicknamed Saint Paul ===
- Jean Baptiste Lolo (1798–?), often referred to as "St. Paul" or "Chief St. Paul", a fur trader, interpreter and First Nations chief in early British Columbia, Canada
- Paul Peterson (born 1964), sometimes known as "St. Paul", musician

== Places ==
=== Antigua and Barbuda ===
- Saint Paul Parish, Antigua and Barbuda

=== Australia ===
- The Spot, New South Wales, a locality within the Sydney suburb of Randwick also known as St Pauls

=== Brazil ===
- São Paulo, the capital of São Paulo state, and the country's largest city
- São Paulo (state) (SP)

=== Canada ===
==== Alberta ====
- St. Paul, Alberta
- St. Paul (provincial electoral district), a former riding in Alberta
  - Lac La Biche-St. Paul, the former riding which replaced it in 1993
  - Lac La Biche-St. Paul-Two Hills, the current riding, which replaced it in 2012
- County of St. Paul No. 19

==== Manitoba ====
- St. Paul (Manitoba electoral district), a riding in Manitoba

==== Newfoundland and Labrador ====
- St. Pauls, Newfoundland and Labrador

==== New Brunswick ====
- Saint-Paul, New Brunswick, often called Saint-Paul-de-Kent
- St. Paul, a former local service district in Gloucester County absorbed by the villages of Grande Anse, New Brunswick and Saint-Léolin, New Brunswick
- Saint-Paul Parish, New Brunswick

==== Nova Scotia ====
- St. Pauls, Nova Scotia
- St. Paul Island (Nova Scotia)

==== Ontario ====
- St. Paul's (electoral district), a riding in Toronto
- St. Pauls Station, Ontario, a community in Perth South
- Niagara Regional Road 81, known as Saint Paul Street in Saint Catharines

==== Quebec ====
- Ville-Saint-Paul, part of a district in the borough Le Sud-Ouest in Montreal
- Rue Saint-Paul (Montreal) in Old Montreal
- Saint-Paul, Quebec
- Saint-Paul-d'Abbotsford, Quebec
- Saint-Paul-de-Montminy, Quebec
- Saint-Paul-de-l'Île-aux-Noix, Quebec
- Saint-Paul-de-la-Croix, Quebec
- Saint-Paulin, Quebec
- Nuns' Island, originally Île Saint-Paul, part of Montreal city, Canada

=== Dominica ===
- Saint Paul Parish, Dominica

=== France ===
- Saint-Paul, Alpes-Maritimes
- Saint-Paul, Corrèze
- Saint-Paul, Gironde
- Saint-Paul, Hautes-Pyrénées
- Saint-Paul, Haute-Vienne
- Saint-Paul, Oise
- Saint-Paul, Orne
- Saint-Paul, Savoie
- Saint-Paul, Vosges
- Saint-Paul, Réunion
- Saint-Paul-aux-Bois, in the Aisne département
- Saint-Paul-Cap-de-Joux, in the Tarn département
- Saint-Paul-de-Baïse, in the Gers département
- Saint-Paul-de-Fenouillet, in the Pyrénées-Orientales département
- Saint-Paul-de-Fourques, in the Eure département
- Saint-Paul-de-Jarrat, in the Ariège département
- Saint-Paul-de-Loubressac, in the Lot département
- Saint-Paul-de-Salers, in the Cantal département
- Saint-Paul-de-Serre, in the Dordogne département
- Saint-Paul-des-Landes, in the Cantal département
- Saint-Paul-d'Espis, in the Tarn-et-Garonne département
- Saint-Paul-de-Tartas, in the Haute-Loire département
- Saint-Paul-de-Varax, in the Ain département
- Saint-Paul-de-Varces, in the Isère département
- Saint-Paul-de-Vence, in the Alpes-Maritimes département
- Saint-Paul-de-Vern, in the Lot département
- Saint-Paul-de-Vézelin, in the Loire département
- Saint-Paul-d'Izeaux, in the Isère département
- Saint-Paul-d'Oueil, in the Haute-Garonne département
- Saint-Paul-du-Bois, in the Maine-et-Loire département
- Saint-Paul-du-Vernay, in the Calvados département
- Saint-Paul-d'Uzore, in the Loire département
- Saint-Paul-en-Born, in the Landes département
- Saint-Paul-en-Chablais, in the Haute-Savoie département
- Saint-Paul-en-Cornillon, in the Loire département
- Saint-Paul-en-Forêt, in the Var département
- Saint-Paul-en-Gâtine, in the Deux-Sèvres département
- Saint-Paul-en-Jarez, in the Loire département
- Saint-Paul-en-Pareds, in the Vendée département
- Saint-Paul-et-Valmalle, in the Hérault département
- Saint-Paul-la-Coste, in the Gard département
- Saint-Paul-la-Roche, in the Dordogne département
- Saint-Paul-le-Froid, in the Lozère département
- Saint-Paul-le-Gaultier, in the Sarthe département
- Saint-Paul-le-Jeune, in the Ardèche département
- Saint-Paul-lès-Dax, in the Landes département
- Saint-Paul-lès-Durance, in the Bouches-du-Rhône département
- Saint-Paul-les-Fonts, in the Gard département
- Saint-Paul-lès-Monestier, in the Isère département
- Saint-Paul-lès-Romans, in the Drôme département
- Saint-Paul-Lizonne, in the Dordogne département
- Saint-Paul-Mont-Penit, in the Vendée département
- Saint-Paul-sur-Isère, in the Savoie département
- Saint-Paul-sur-Save, in the Haute-Garonne département
- Saint-Paul-sur-Ubaye, in the Alpes-de-Haute-Provence département
- Saint-Paul-Trois-Châteaux, in the Drôme département
- Île Saint-Paul, an island in the French Southern Territories

=== Germany ===
- St. Pauli, a quarter of Hamburg

=== Liberia ===
- Saint Paul River

=== Malta ===
- St. Paul's Bay
- St. Paul's Hill
- San Pawl Milqi
- St Paul's Island

=== Saint Helena ===
- Saint Paul's, Saint Helena, a district

=== Saint Kitts and Nevis ===
- Saint Paul Capisterre, Saint Kitts
- Saint Paul Charlestown, Nevis
- Saint Paul Capesterre Village, Saint Kitts

=== Turkey ===
- Saint Paul Trail, a long-distance footpath in Turkey

=== United Kingdom ===
- St Paul Malmesbury Without, a parish in Wiltshire
- St Pauls, Bristol, a district
- St. Pauls, Cheltenham
- St Paul's Cathedral, London

=== United States ===
- St. Paul, Alaska (a city on Saint Paul Island, Alaska)
- St. Paul, Arkansas
- San Pablo, California
- Saint Paul, Illinois
- St. Paul, Iowa
- St. Paul, Indiana
- St. Paul, Kansas
- St. Paul, Missouri
- St. Paul, Nebraska
- St. Pauls, North Carolina
- Saint Paul, Ohio
- St. Paul, Oregon
- St. Paul, Collin County, Texas
- St. Paul, San Patricio County, Texas
- St. Paul, Virginia

== Brands and enterprises ==
- St. Paul Travelers, the product of a merger between the spun off subsidiary of Citigroup and St. Paul
- Saint-Paul Luxembourg, a media conglomerate in Luxembourg
- St Pauls, a British publishing company owned by the Society of Saint Paul

== Buildings and institutions ==
=== Churches ===
==== Australia ====
- St Paul's Cathedral, Melbourne
- St Paul's Church, Manuka

==== Canada ====
- St. Paul The Apostle Maltese Church in Toronto
- St. Paul's, Bloor Street
- St. Paul's Basilica (Toronto)
- Trinity-St. Paul's United Church, Toronto
- St. Paul's Presbyterian Church, Glace Bay, Nova Scotia

==== Germany ====
- Paulskirche, Frankfurt, a former church, now a hall in Frankfurt am Main

==== Greece ====
- Agiou Pavlou monastery, named after St. Paul, on Mount Athos

==== Hong Kong ====
- St. Paul's Church (Glenealy), at St. Paul's College, Hong Kong, Glenealy, Victoria City
- St. Paul's Mass Centre, a Catholic church in Hong Kong

==== Italy ====
- Basilica of Saint Paul Outside the Walls, in Rome, traditional burial place of Paul the Apostle
- Saint Paul, Brugherio

==== Lebanon ====
- The Armenian Apostolic Saint Paul Church, Anjar, Lebanon
- Convent of Saint Paul, Ehden
- Greek Catholic Basilica of Saint Paul in, Harissa, Lebanon
- Saint Peter & Saint Paul Church, Qornet Shehwan

==== Macau ====
- Cathedral of Saint Paul in Macau

==== Malaysia ====
- St. Paul's Church, Malacca

==== Malta ====
- St Paul's Cathedral, Mdina
- Collegiate Parish Church of St Paul's Shipwreck

==== New Zealand ====
- Old Saint Paul's, Wellington, a former church

==== Philippines ====
- Saints Peter and Paul Church, Makati City, Metro Manila

==== Portugal ====
- Saint Paul Church in Braga

==== United Kingdom ====
- St Paul's Cathedral in London, England, designed by Christopher Wren
- St Paul's Church, Knightsbridge, in Wilton Place
- St Paul's, Covent Garden in London, designed by Inigo Jones and also known as the Actors' Church
- Old St Paul's Cathedral, a cathedral in the City of London, destroyed in 1666 in a fire and replaced by Wren's cathedral
- Old Saint Paul's, Edinburgh, of the Scottish Episcopal Church
- St Paul's Tower, a residential tower in Sheffield
- St Paul's Church, Wordsworth Avenue in Sheffield
- St Paul's, Frizington, Cumbria
- St Paul's, Harringay, London

==== United States ====
- Cathedral of Saint Paul, National Shrine of the Apostle Paul in St. Paul, Minnesota
- Cathedral of Saint Paul in Birmingham in Birmingham, Alabama
- Cathedral of Saint Paul in Pittsburgh, Pennsylvania
- Cathedral of Saint Paul in Worcester in Worcester, Massachusetts
- Saint Paul Catholic Church (Ellicott City, Maryland)
- Saint Paul's Episcopal Church (Morganton, North Carolina)
- St. Paul Cathedral (Yakima, Washington)
- St. Paul Church (Over the Rhine) in Cincinnati, Ohio
- St. Paul's Church (Cambridge, Massachusetts)
- St. Paul's Episcopal Church (Georgetown, Delaware)
- St. Paul's Episcopal Church (Richmond, Virginia)
- St. Paul's Episcopal Church, Milwaukee, Wisconsin
- St. Paul's United Church of Christ of Laramie in Wyoming
- St. Paul's Episcopal Church, South Bass Island in Put-in-Bay, Ohio

=== Colleges, schools and universities ===
==== Australia ====
- St Paul's Anglican Grammar School in Warragul, Victoria
- St Paul's College, Adelaide
- St. Paul's College, Melbourne
- St Paul's College, University of Sydney
- St Paul's School, Bald Hills in Brisbane
- St Paul's High School, Booragul in Lake Macquarie (New South Wales)

==== Canada ====
- St. Paul's College (Manitoba), Winnipeg
- St. Paul's University College, University of Waterloo, Ontario
- St. Paul Secondary School, Mississauga, Ontario
- St. Paul Catholic High School (Niagara Falls, Ontario), a high school in Ontario
- Saint Paul University, Ottawa, Ontario
- St. Paul's High School (Winnipeg), Winnipeg, Manitoba
- St. Paul High School (Ottawa), Ontario

==== Hong Kong ====
- St. Paul's Convent School
- St. Paul's Co-educational College
- St. Paul's College, Hong Kong
- St. Paul's Secondary School
- St. Paul's School (Lam Tin)

==== India ====
- St Paul's High School, Hyderabad
- St. Paul's School, Belgaum in Camp
- St. Paul's School, Darjeeling

==== Ireland ====
- St Paul's College, Raheny

==== Japan ====
- St. Paul's University, an alternate name for Rikkyo University

==== Malaysia ====
- St. Paul's Institution, Seremban

==== New Zealand ====
- St Paul's College, Auckland
- St Paul's Collegiate School, Hamilton

==== Philippines ====
- St. Paul University System (7 campuses)

==== United Kingdom ====
- St Paul's Catholic Comprehensive School and Performing Arts College, Leicester
- St Paul's Catholic School, Milton Keynes
- St. Paul's College, Sunbury-on-Thames
- St Paul's Girls' School, London
- St Paul's School, London

==== United States ====
- St. Paul High School (Santa Fe Springs, California)
- St. Paul's School (Covington, Louisiana)
- St. Paul's School (Brooklandville, Maryland), near Baltimore
- St. Paul's School for Girls (Maryland), Brooklandville, Maryland
- Saint Paul College, Saint Paul, Minnesota
- St. Paul Academy and Summit School, Saint Paul, Minnesota
- St. Paul's College in St. Paul Park, Minnesota
- St. Paul's School (Concord, New Hampshire)
- St. Paul's School (Garden City, New York)
- Saint Paul's College, Virginia
- St. Paul's College, Washington, D.C.

==== Other countries ====
- St. Paul's College, Namibia
- St Paul's School, Brazil

=== Stadiums ===
- Stadio San Paolo, football stadium in Naples, Italy

== Paintings ==
- Saint Paul (Gonçalves), c. 1470–1480
- Saint Paul (El Greco), c. 1610–1614
- Saint Paul (Masaccio), a panel of Masaccio's Pisa Altarpiece, 1426
- Saint Paul (Velázquez), c. 1619

== Rail transportation ==
- Saint-Paul station (Paris Metro), a station on the Paris Metro Line 1
- St Paul's tube station, a station on the Central Line of the London Underground
- St Paul's tram stop, a tram stop in Birmingham, England

== Ships ==
- Saint Pauli, a New Zealand Company chartered sailing ship that bought German settlers to Nelson
- USS Saint Paul, any of four US Navy vessels
- HMS Speedy (1782), a brig that served in the French Navy as Saint Paul from 1801 to 1802

== Sports ==
- St Paul's Camogie Club, a former women's sport club in Kilkenny City, Ireland
- FC St. Pauli, a German sports club

== Other uses ==
- St. Paul (oratorio), an oratorio by Felix Mendelssohn
- Saint Paul Peak, a mountain in Montana, US
- St. Paul sandwich, a Chinese-American sandwich from St. Louis, Missouri

== See also ==
- Paul (disambiguation)
- St Paul Island (disambiguation)
- St. Pauli Girl, a German beer
- San Pablo (disambiguation)
- San Paolo (disambiguation)
- Sant Pau (disambiguation)
- São Paulo (disambiguation)
- St Paul's Creative Centre, headquarters for various organisations in Adelaide, South Australia
- Vincent de Paul
