= Malta (island) =

Largest island of the Maltese Archipelago

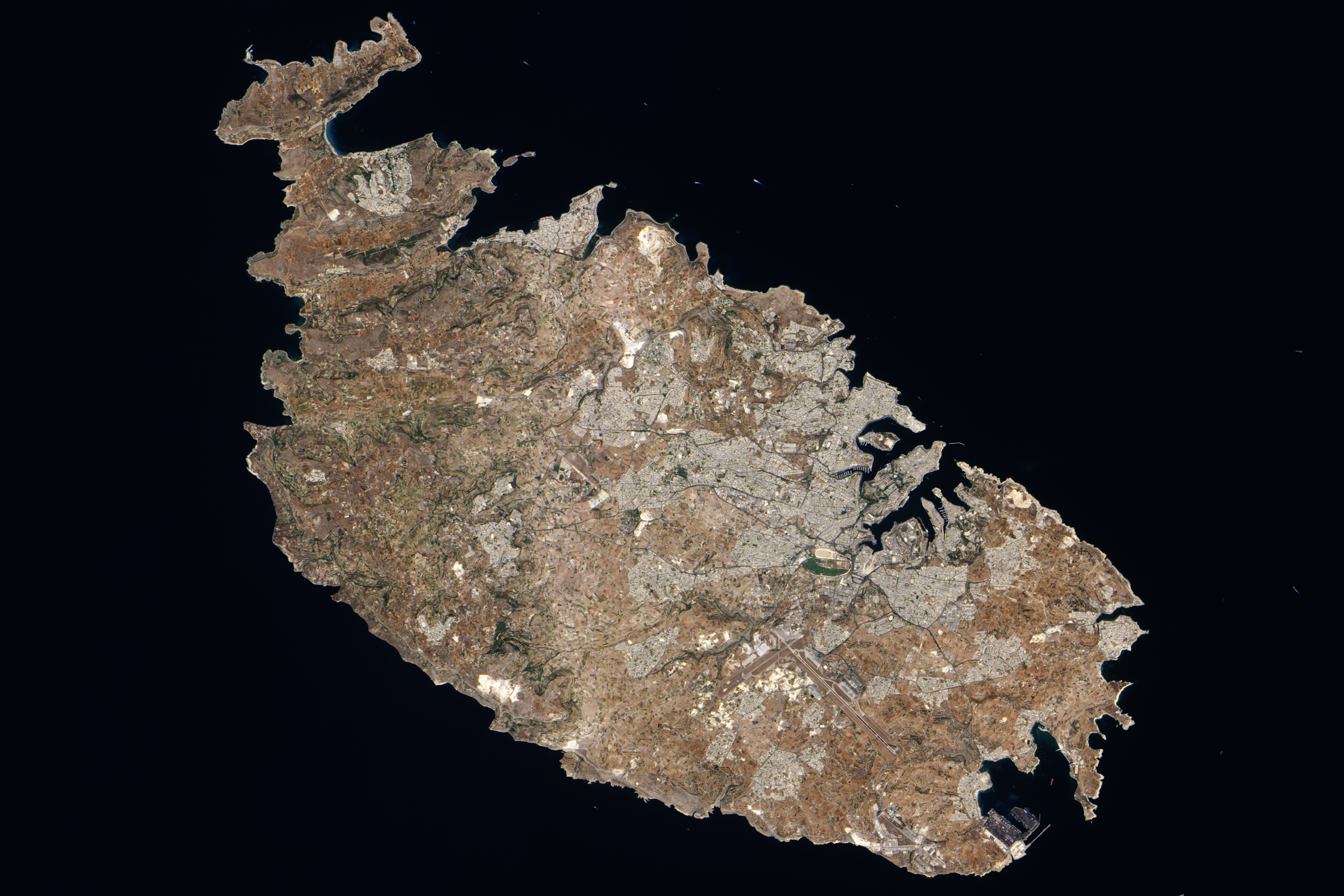
- Satellite image of Malta

- Map of the Maltese Archipelago highlighting the island of Malta

Geography
- Location: South of Sicily, Mediterranean Sea
- Coordinates: 35°53′N 14°27′E
- Archipelago: Maltese Archipelago
- Total islands: 5 islands that surround Malta
- Major islands: Filfa, St Paul's Islands, Manoel Island.
- Area: 246 km^{2} (95 sq mi)
- Coastline: 197 km (122.4 mi)
- Highest elevation: 253 m (830 ft)
- Highest point: Ta' Dmejrek

Administration
- Malta
- Capital city: Valletta
- Largest settlement: St. Paul's Bay (pop. 29,097)

Demographics
- Population: Approx. 500,000 (May 2021)
- Pop. density: 1,664/km^{2} (4310/sq mi)
- Ethnic groups: Maltese people

Malta is an island in Southern Europe. It is the largest and most populous of the three major islands that constitute the Maltese Archipelago and the country of Malta. The island is situated in the Mediterranean Sea directly south of Italy and north of Libya. It lies south-east of the smaller islands of Gozo and Comino. The island is 27 kilometres (17 mi) long and 14.5 kilometres (9 mi) wide, with a total area of 246 square kilometres (95 sq mi). The capital is Valletta, while the largest locality is Rabat. The island is made up of many small towns, which together form one larger urban zone with a population of 409,259. The landscape is characterised by low hills with terraced fields.

== History ==
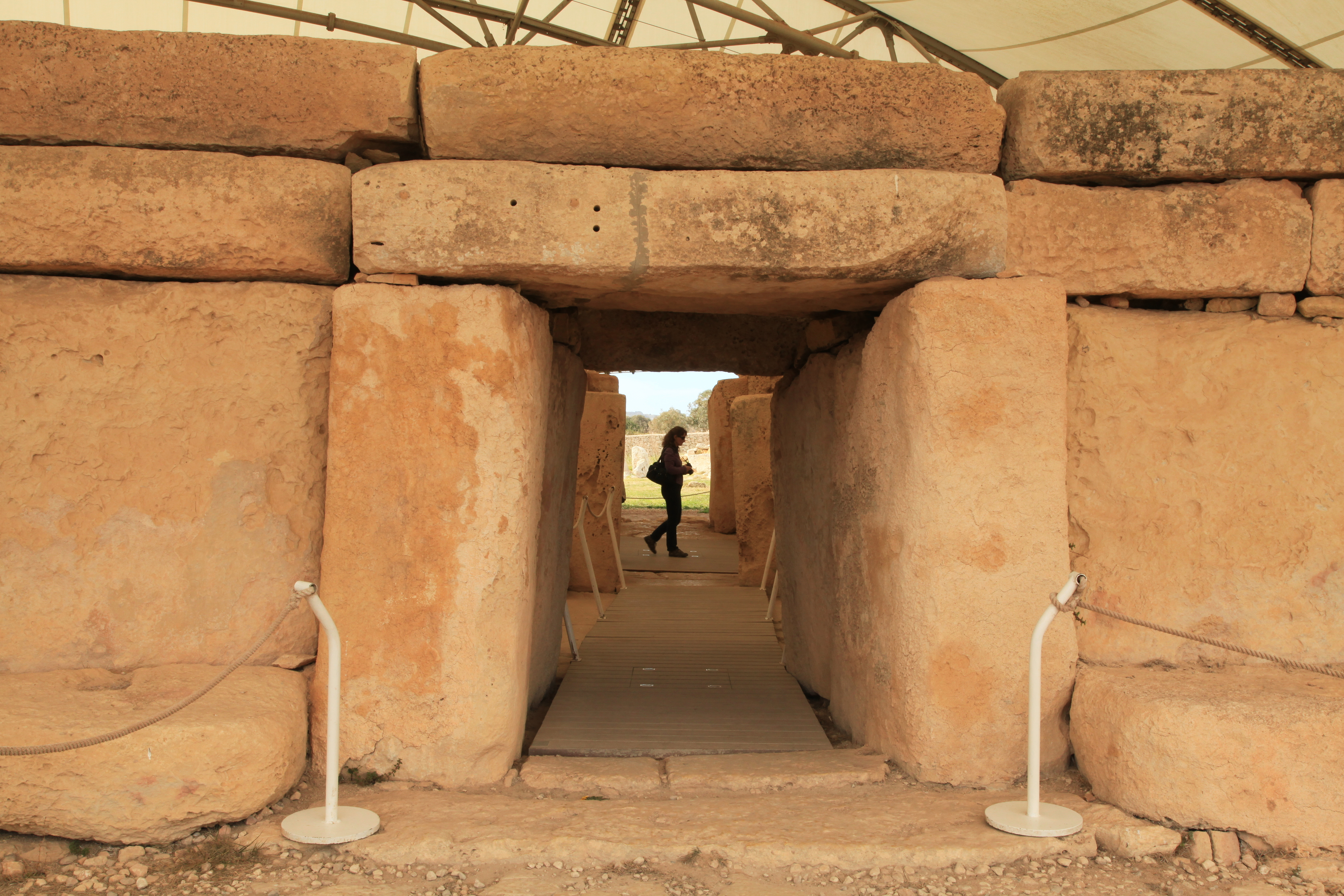
Ħaġar Qim

Humans have inhabited Malta since about 5200 BC, when Stone Age hunters or farmers arrived from Sicily. Early Neolithic settlements were discovered in open areas and also in caves, such as Għar Dalam. Around 3500 BC, a culture of megalithic temple builders then either supplanted or arose. They built some of the oldest existing, free-standing structures in the world in the form of megalithic temples such as those at Ħaġar Qim and Mnajdra. After 2500 BC, Malta was depopulated but soon became the home of Bronze Age settlers, who settled in sites such as Borġ in-Nadur. They built first fortifications in Malta.

Malta was later ruled by the Phoenicians, Carthaginians, Romans, Byzantines and Arabs before it was occupied by the County of Sicily in 1091. The island then became part of the Kingdom of Sicily until it was given to the Order of Saint John along with Gozo and Tripoli (North Africa) in 1530. In 1192 Tancred, King of Sicily created Margaritus of Brindisi the first Count of Malta. In 1565, the Order and the Maltese withstood a major Ottoman invasion which became known as the Great Siege of Malta. The Order ruled Malta for over 250 years and built many great pieces of architecture, including the capital city Valletta. In 1798, the French under Napoleon occupied Malta and ruled from 1798–1800. Napoleon's stay lasted from 12–18 June when he resided at Palazzo Parisio in Valletta. The French remained until the Maltese rebelled against their rule. In 1800, the British took control over Malta and the island initially became a British protectorate, and a colony a couple of years later. The British ruled for about 150 years and Malta became independent in 1964. Ten years later the State of Malta became the Republic of Malta. Malta joined the European Union in 2004 and adopted the Euro four years later.

== Geography ==
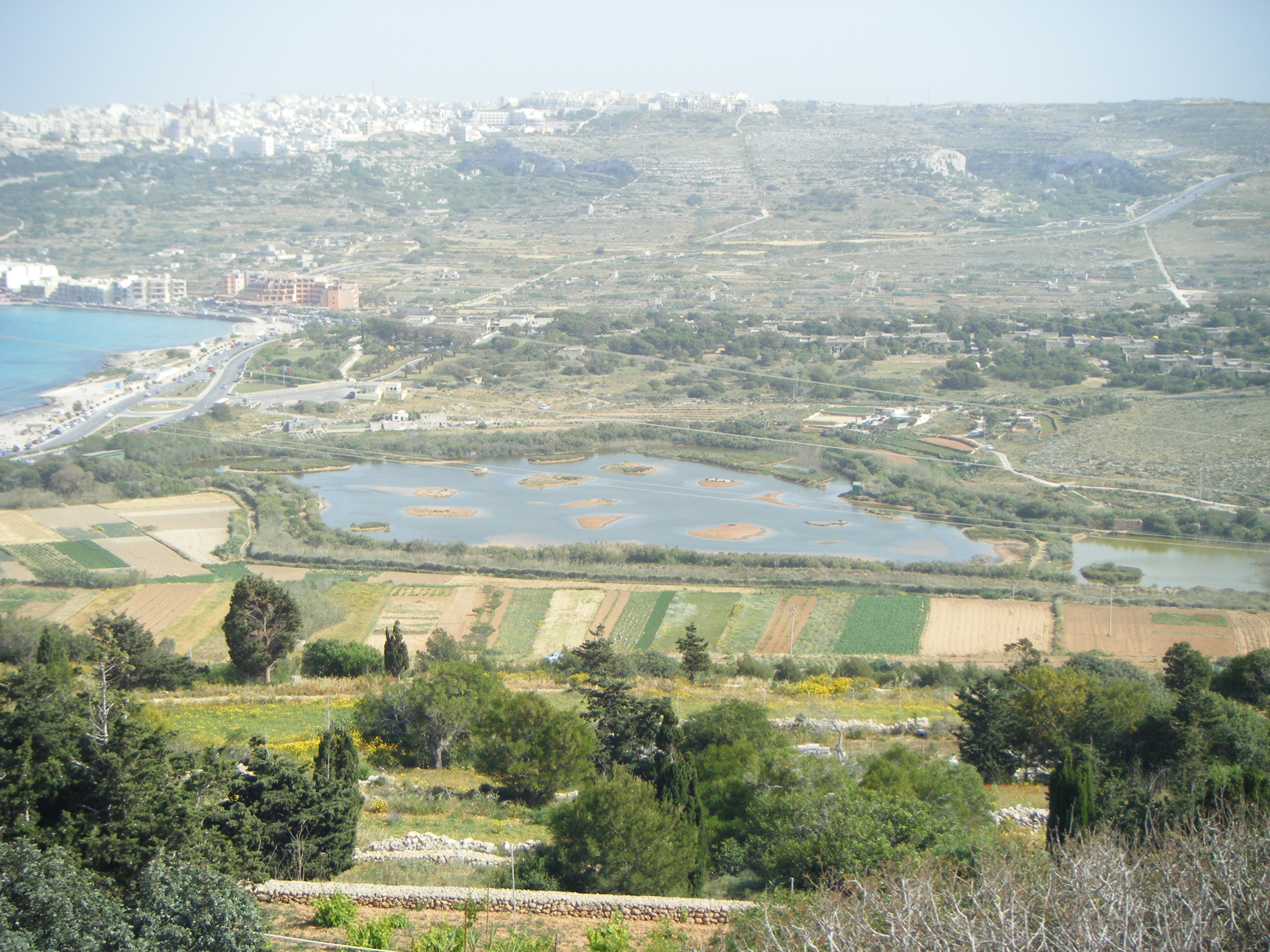
Maltese landscape, Għadira

Malta is the largest island in an archipelago in the central Mediterranean, some 80 km (50 mi) south of the Italian island of Sicily across the Malta Channel. Malta is located east of its sister islands of Gozo and Comino. It lies on the Malta plateau, a shallow shelf formed from the high points of a land bridge between Sicily and North Africa that became isolated as sea levels rose after the last ice age. Malta is therefore situated in the zone between the Eurasian and African tectonic plates.

Numerous bays along the indented coastline of the islands provide good harbours. The landscape consists of low hills with terraced fields. The highest point in Malta is Ta' Dmejrek, at 253 m (830 ft), near Dingli. Although there are some small rivers at times of high rainfall, there are no permanent rivers or lakes on Malta. However, some watercourses have fresh water running all year round, such as those at Ras ir-Raħeb near Baħrija and at l-Imtaħleb.

Phytogeographically, Malta belongs to the Liguro-Tyrrhenian province of the Mediterranean Region within the Boreal Kingdom. According to the WWF, the territory of Malta belongs to the ecoregion of "Mediterranean Forests, Woodlands and Scrub".

Some minor islands off the main island of Malta include:

- Dellimara Island (Marsaxlokk)
- Filfla (Żurrieq/Siġġiewi)
- Għallis Rock (Naxxar)
- St Paul's Islands (Mellieħa)
- Manoel Island (Gżira) - connected to the mainland via a bridge
- Mistra Rocks (San Pawl il-Baħar)
- Qawra Point/Ta' Fraben Island (San Pawl il-Baħar)
- Sala Rock (Żabbar)
- Xrobb l-Għaġin Rock (Marsaxlokk)

=== Climate ===
Malta has a Subtropical–Mediterranean climate (Köppen climate classification Csa), with very mild winters and hot summers. Rain occurs mainly in winter, with summer being generally dry. According to International Living, Malta is the country with the best climate in the world.

The average yearly temperature is around 23 °C (73 °F) during the day and 16 °C (61 °F) at night. In the coldest month, January, the typically maximum temperature ranges from 12 to 20 °C (54 to 68 °F) during the day and minimum 7 to 12 °C (45 to 54 °F) at night. In the warmest month, August, the typically maximum temperature ranges from 28 to 34 °C (82 to 93 °F) during the day and minimum 20 to 24 °C (68 to 75 °F) at night. Generally, summers/holiday season lasts to 8 months, starting from around mid-April with temperatures 19–23 °C (66–73 °F) during the day and 13–14 °C (55–57 °F) at night, ending in November with temperatures 17–23 °C (63–73 °F) during the day and 11–20 °C (52–68 °F) at night, although also in the remaining 4 months temperatures sometimes reach 20 °C (68 °F). Amongst all capitals in the continent of Europe, Valletta, the capital of Malta, has the warmest winters, with average temperatures of around 16 °C (61 °F) during the day and 10 °C (50 °F) at night in the period January–February. In March and December average temperature is around 17 °C (63 °F) during the day and 11 °C (52 °F) at night. Large fluctuations in temperature are rare. Also, Malta is one of the few places in Europe which are "green" all year round.

Average annual temperature of the sea is 20 °C (68 °F) (the highest in the continent of Europe), from 15 °C (59 °F) in February to 26 °C (79 °F) in August. In the 6 months from June to November, the average sea temperature exceeds 20 °C (68 °F).

Sunshine duration hours total around 3,000 per year (one of the highest results in Europe), from an average above five hours of sunshine per day in December to an average above 12 hours in July. This is about double that of cities in the northern half of Europe, for comparison: London – 1,461; however, in winter it has up to several times more sunshine; for comparison: in December, London has 37 hours of sunshine whereas Malta has about 160.

Climate data for Malta (Balzan in the central part of the island) 1985–
Month	Jan	Feb	Mar	Apr	May	Jun	Jul	Aug	Sep	Oct	Nov	Dec	Year
Mean daily maximum °C (°F)	16.1 (61.0)	16.0 (60.8)	17.8 (64.0)	20.0 (68.0)	24.2 (75.6)	28.5 (83.3)	33.72 (92.70)	36.34 (97.41)	28.4 (83.1)	25.2 (77.4)	21.0 (69.8)	17.5 (63.5)	23.16 (73.69)
Daily mean °C (°F)	13 (55)	16 (61)	17 (63)	19 (66)	23 (73)	27 (81)	32 (90)	33.4 (92.1)	28 (82)	25 (77)	18 (64)	14.7 (58.5)	19.73 (67.51)
Mean daily minimum °C (°F)	10.3 (50.5)	9.9 (49.8)	11.3 (52.3)	13.3 (55.9)	16.6 (61.9)	20.3 (68.5)	22.8 (73.0)	23.6 (74.5)	21.6 (70.9)	18.6 (65.5)	15.0 (59.0)	11.9 (53.4)	16.26 (61.27)
Average precipitation mm (inches)	94.7 (3.73)	63.4 (2.50)	37.0 (1.46)	26.3 (1.04)	9.2 (0.36)	5.4 (0.21)	0.2 (0.01)	6.0 (0.24)	67.4 (2.65)	77.2 (3.04)	108.6 (4.28)	107.7 (4.24)	603.1 (23.74)
Average precipitation days	15	12	9	6	3	1	0	1	5	9	13	16	90
Mean monthly sunshine hours	169.3	178.1	227.2	253.8	309.7	336.9	376.7	352.2	270.0	223.8	195.0	161.2	3,053.9
Source: maltaweather.com (Meteo Malta & MaltaMedia)

=== Urbanization ===
According to Eurostat, Malta Island is a single Larger Urban Zone nominally referred to as "Valletta". According to Demographia, the whole country is identified as urban area. According to European Spatial Planning Observation Network, Malta is identified as Functional Urban Area (FUA). According to United Nations, about 95% of Malta is urban area and the number grows every year. Also, according to the results of ESPON and EU Commission studies, "the whole territory of Malta constitutes a single urban region".

== Economy ==
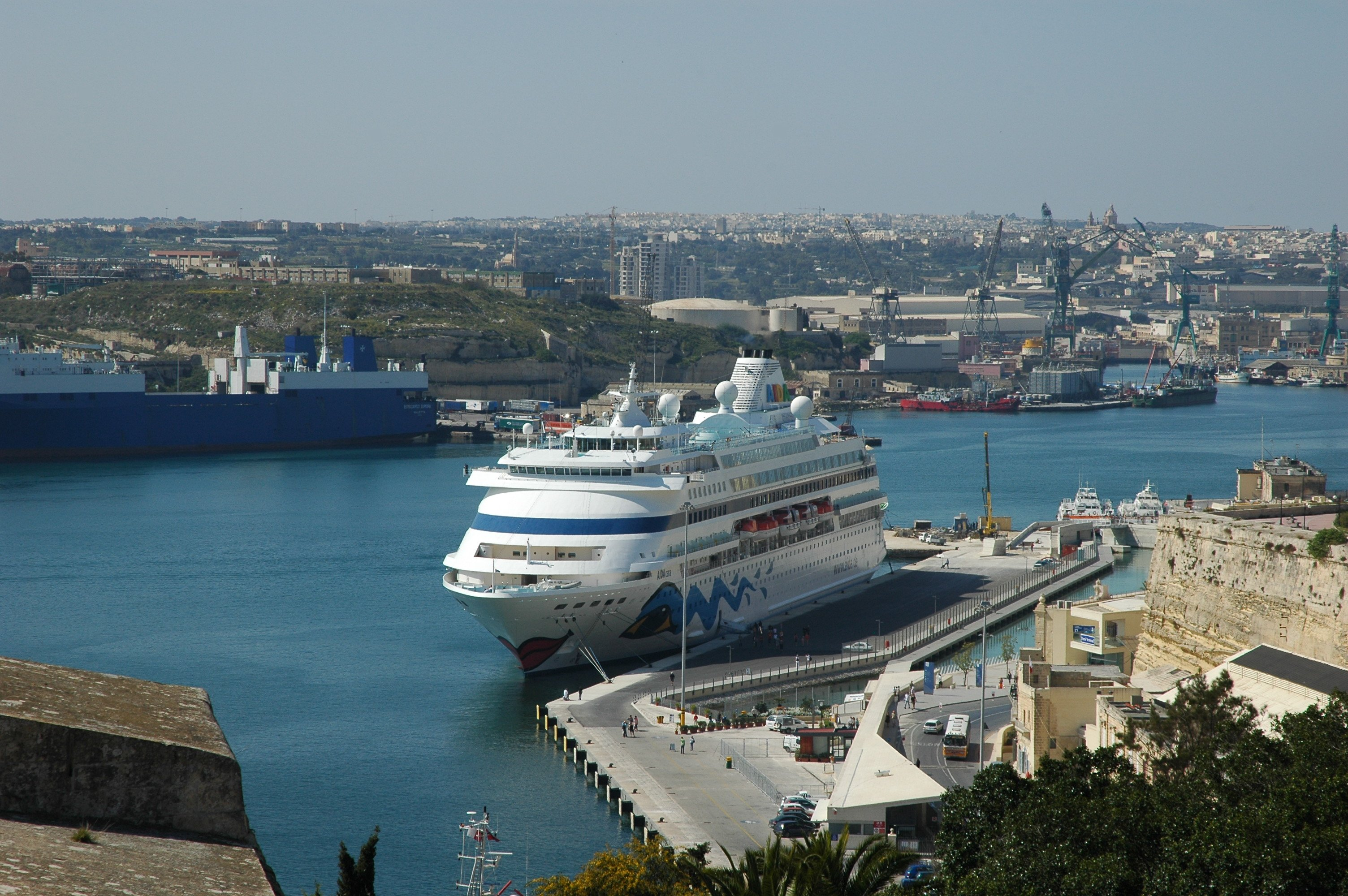
Valletta's maritime industrial zone

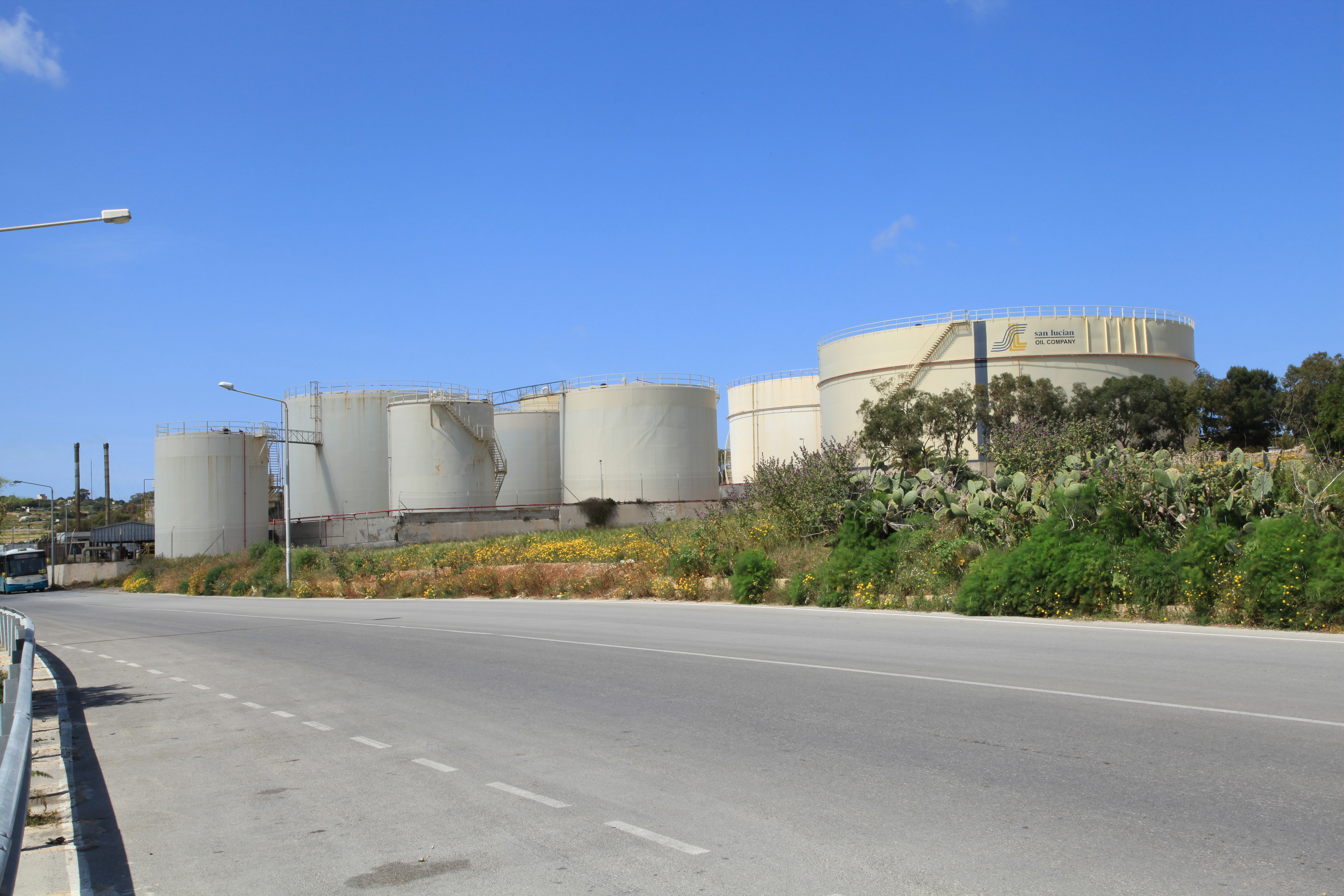
Oil tanks in Birżebbuġa

The main island of Malta contributes significantly to the country's overall economy, which itself is classified as an advanced economy according to the International Monetary Fund (IMF). Until 1800 Malta depended on cotton, tobacco and its shipyards for exports. Once under British control, they came to depend on Malta Dockyard for support of the Royal Navy, especially during the Crimean War of 1854. Malta's economy was boosted by the opening of the Suez Canal in 1869, as there was a massive increase of civilian shipping which entered the port. Ships stopping at Malta's docks for refuelling helped the Entrepôt trade, which brought additional benefits to the island. Towards the end of the 19th century the economy began declining, and by the 1940s Malta's economy was in serious crisis. One factor was the longer range of newer merchant ships that required less frequent refuelling stops. The economy was boosted again after World War II when the island needed to be rebuilt.

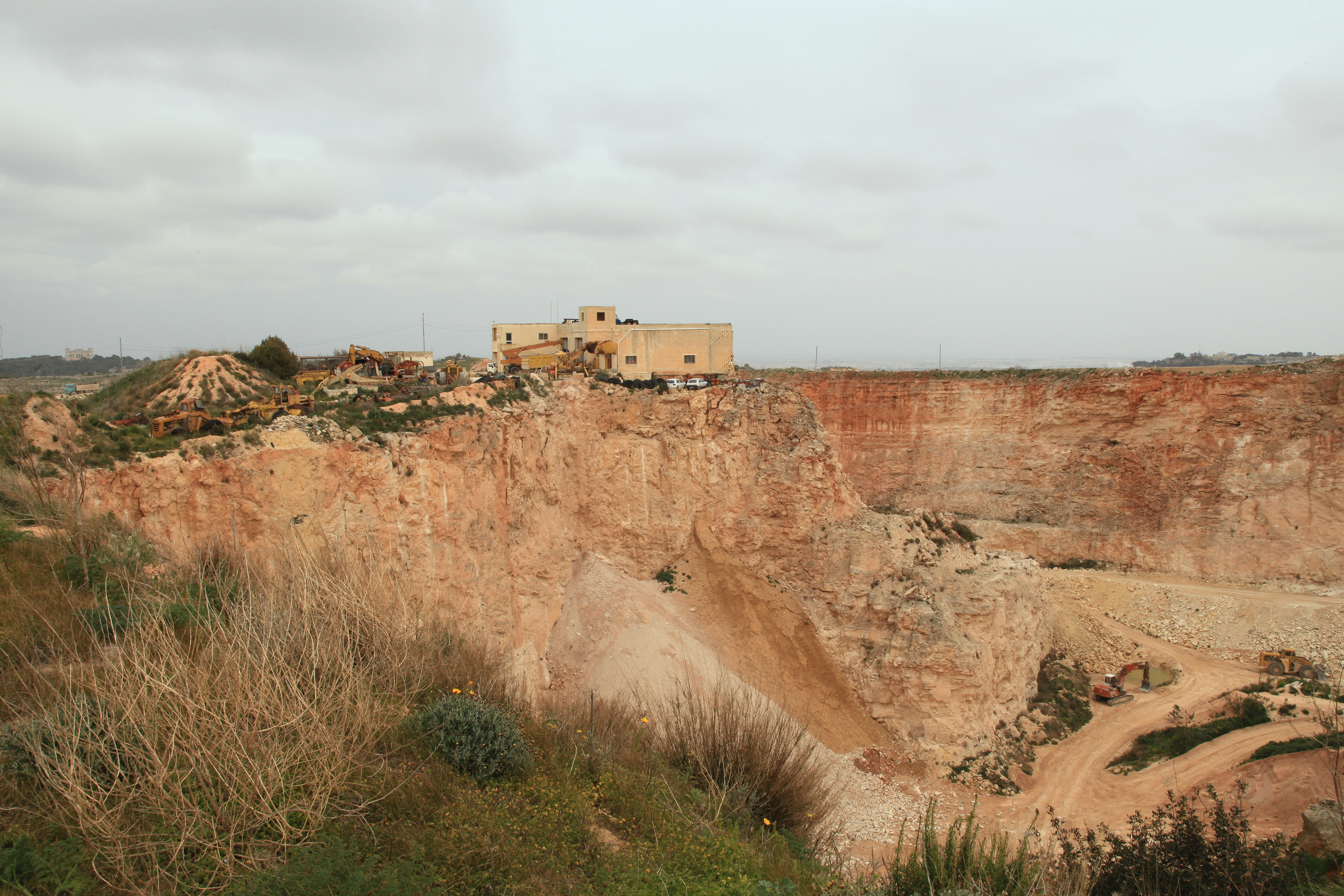
Limestone quarries in Siġġiewi

Currently, Malta's major resources are limestone, a favourable geographic location and a productive labour force. Malta produces only about 20% of its food needs, has limited freshwater supplies because of the drought in the summer and has no domestic energy sources, aside from the potential for solar energy from its plentiful sunlight. The economy is dependent on foreign trade (serving as a freight trans-shipment point), manufacturing (especially electronics and textiles) and tourism.

Film production is a growing contributor to the Maltese economy. Despite its size, Malta continues to attract international film productions from around the world and this is the best sign of confidence that a small country can get from foreign producers. The first film shot in Malta was Sons of the Sea in 1925. Since then, over 100 other films were partially or fully shot in Malta, including Malta Story (1953), Midnight Express (1978), Popeye (1980), Gladiator (2000), Munich (2005), World War Z (2013) and Captain Phillips (2013).

In preparation for Malta's membership in the European Union, which it joined on 1 May 2004, it privatised some state-controlled firms and liberalised markets. For example, the government announced on 8 January 2007 that it was selling its 40% stake in MaltaPost, to complete a privatisation process which had been ongoing for the previous five years. By 2010, Malta had privatised telecommunications, postal services, shipyards and shipbuilding.

=== Banking and finance ===
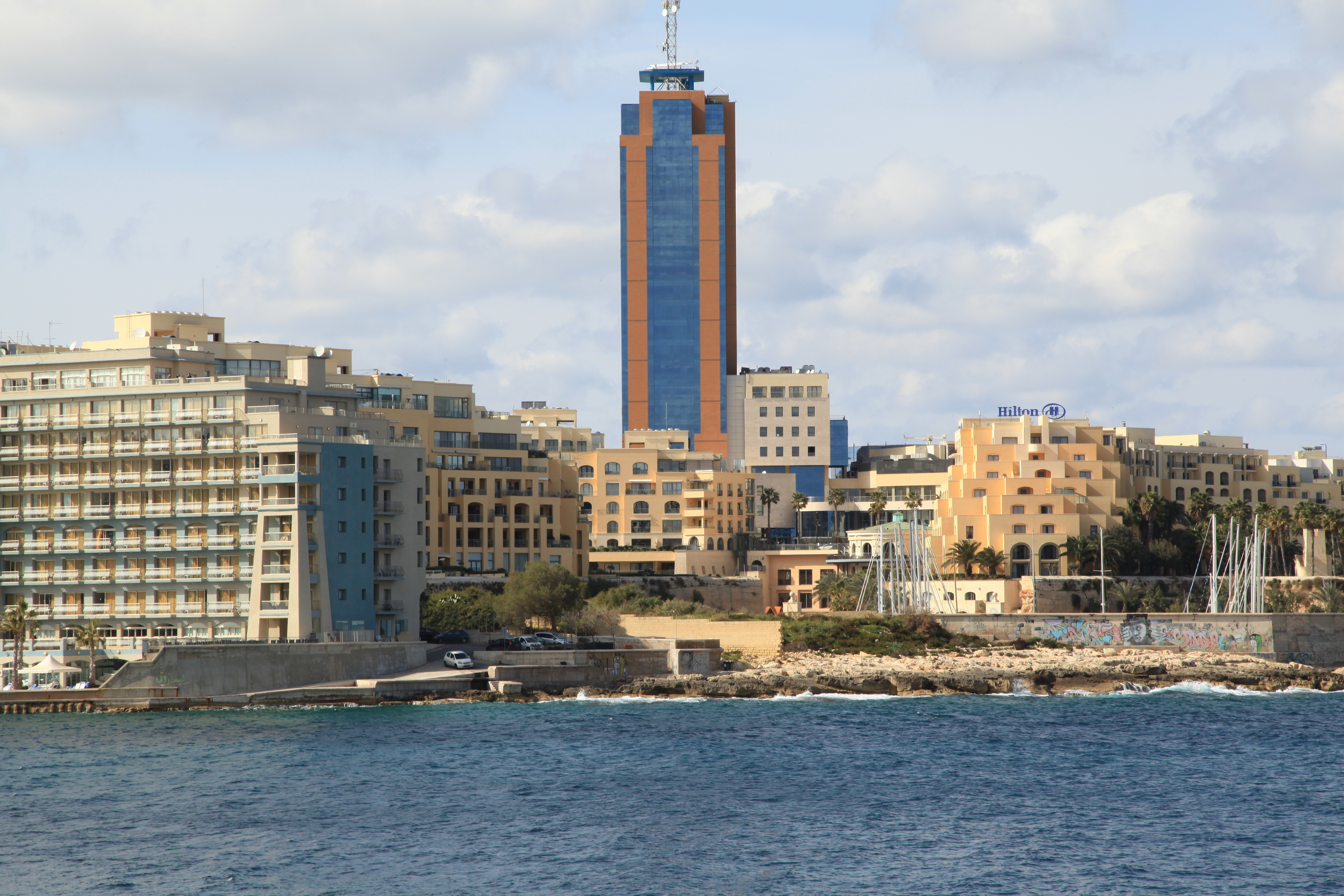
Portomaso Business Tower, the second highest building on Malta.

The two largest commercial banks are Bank of Valletta and HSBC Bank Malta, both of which can trace their origins back to the 19th century.

The Central Bank of Malta (Bank Ċentrali ta' Malta) has two key areas of responsibility: the formulation and implementation of monetary policy and the promotion of a sound and efficient financial system. It was established by the Central Bank of Malta Act on 17 April 1968. The Maltese government entered ERM II on 4 May 2005, and adopted the euro as the country's currency on 1 January 2008.

FinanceMalta is the quasi-governmental organisation tasked with marketing and educating business leaders in coming to Malta and runs seminars and events around the world highlighting the emerging strength of Malta as a jurisdiction for banking and finance and insurance.

=== Transport ===
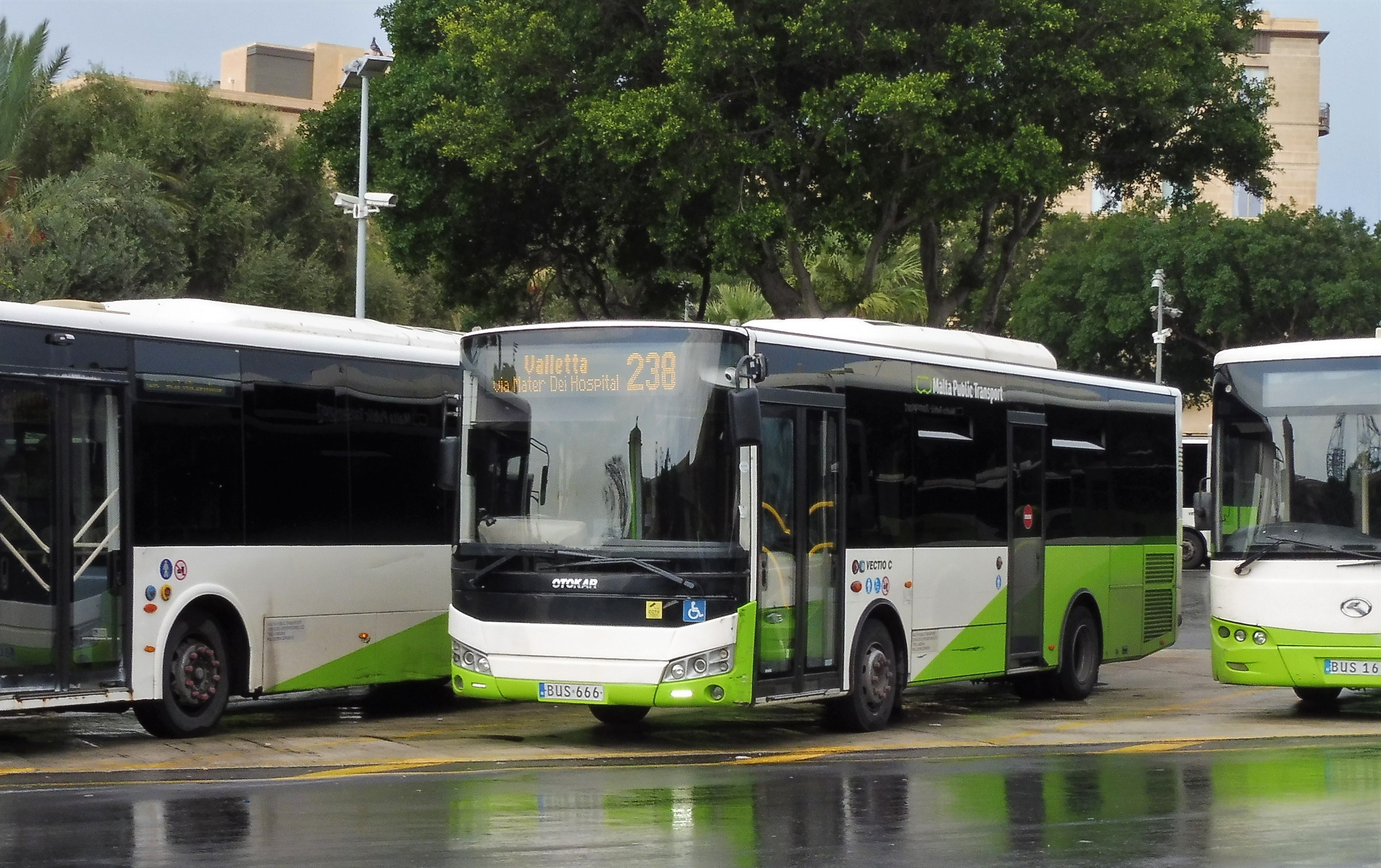
Maltese buses operated by the Malta Public Transport

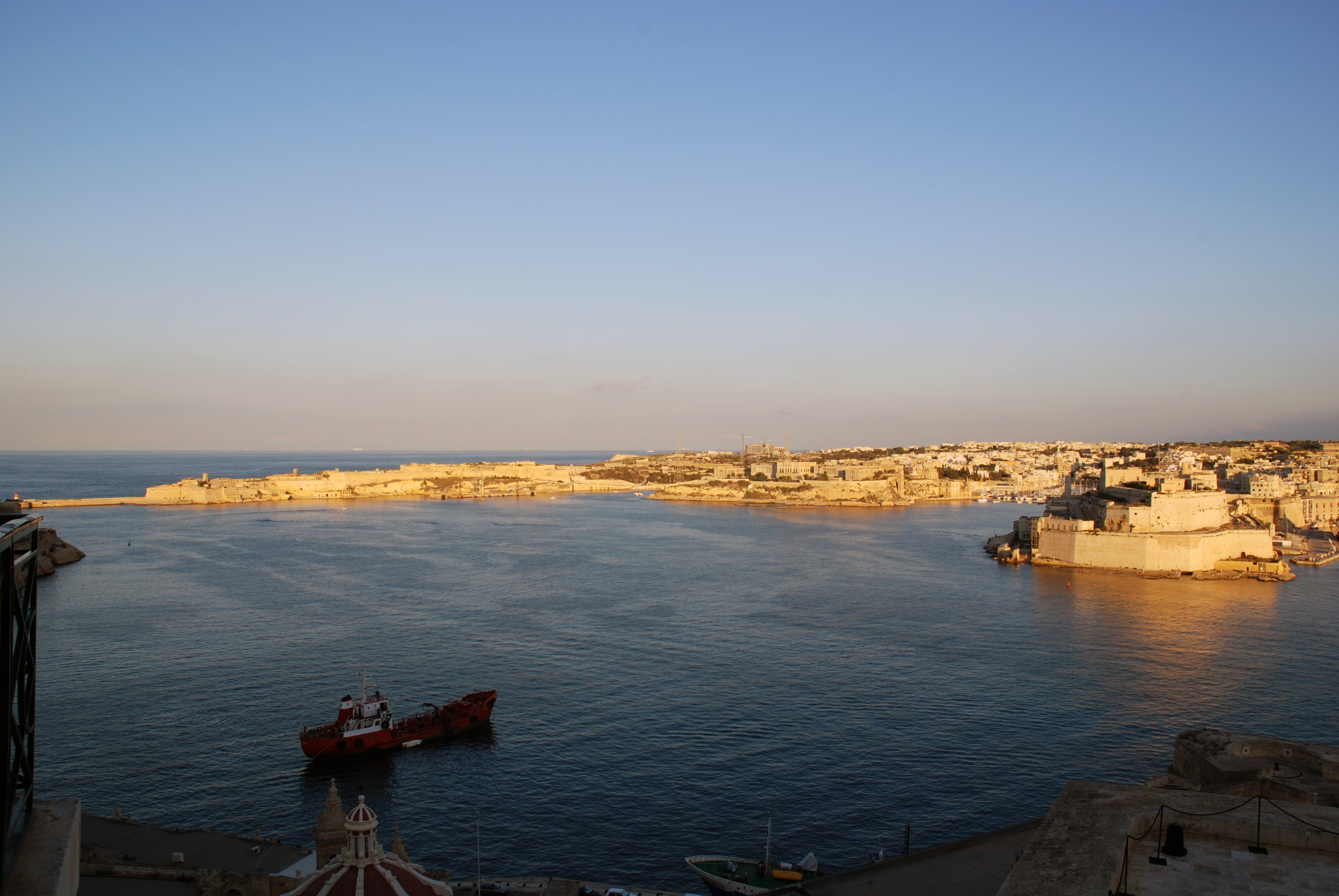
Grand Harbour

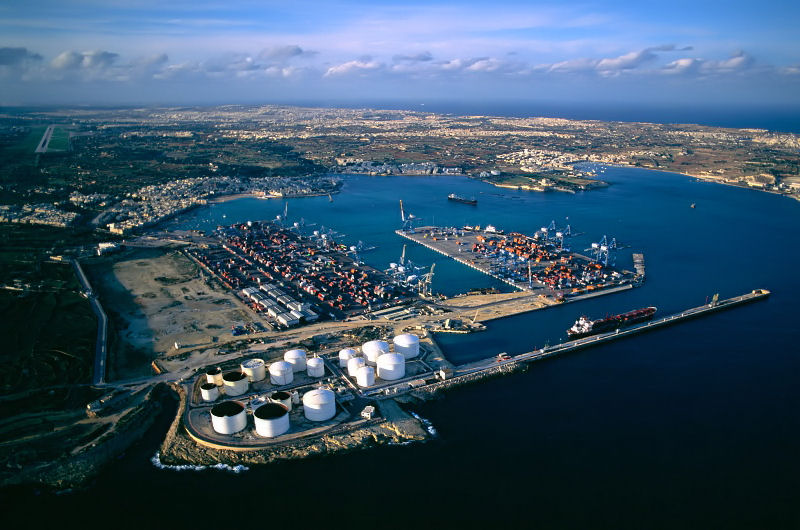
Malta Freeport

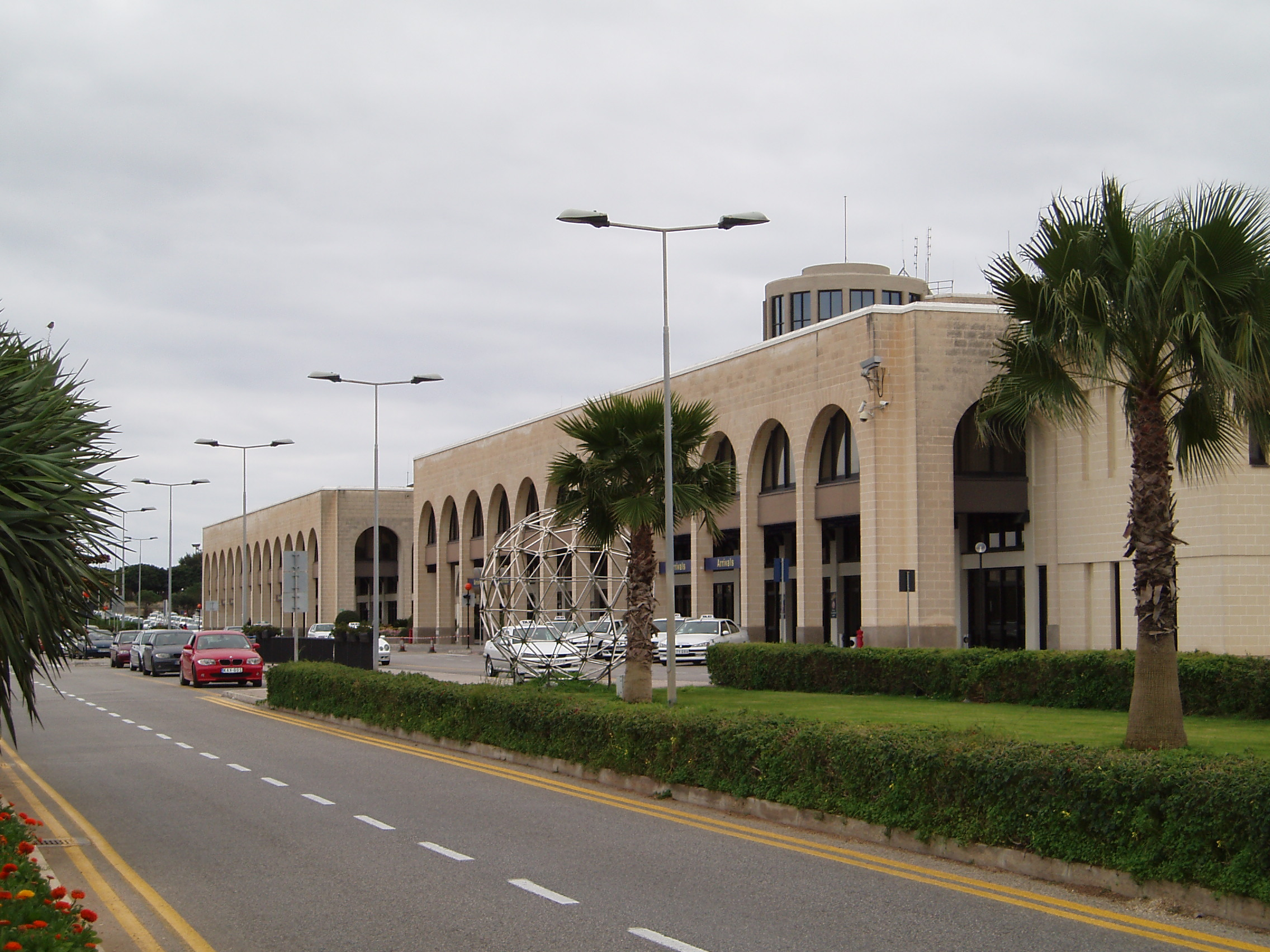
Malta International Airport

Traffic in Malta drives on the left. Car ownership in Malta is exceedingly high, given the very small size of the island.

The main roads of Malta from the southernmost point to the northernmost point are these: Triq Birżebbuġa in Birżebbuġa, Għar Dalam Road and Tal-Barrani Road in Żejtun, Santa Luċija Avenue in Paola, Aldo Moro Street (Trunk Road), 13 December Street and Ħamrun-Marsa Bypass in Marsa, Regional Road in Santa Venera/Msida/Gżira/San Ġwann, St Andrew's Road in Swieqi/Pembroke, Malta, Coast Road in Baħar iċ-Ċagħaq, Salina Road, Kennedy Drive, St. Paul's Bypass and Xemxija Hill in San Pawl il-Baħar, Mistra Hill, Wettinger Street (Mellieħa Bypass) and Marfa Road in Mellieħa.

Buses (xarabank or karozza tal-linja) are the primary method of public transport. Established in 1905, the service underwent an extensive reform in July 2011. The management structure changed from having self-employed drivers driving their own vehicles to a service being offered by a single company through a public tender. The public tender was won by Arriva Malta, a member of the Arriva group, but the company ceased operations on 1 January 2014 having been nationalised as Malta Public Transport by the Maltese government, with a new bus operator to take over their operations in the near future.

Malta has three large natural harbours:

- The Grand Harbour (or Port il-Kbir), located at the eastern side of the capital city of Valletta, has been a harbour since Roman times. It has several extensive docks and wharves, as well as a cruise liner terminal. A terminal at the Grand Harbour serves ferries that connect Malta to Pozzallo & Catania in Sicily.
- Marsamxett Harbour, located on the western side of Valletta, accommodates a number of yacht marinas.
- Marsaxlokk Harbour (Malta Freeport), at Birżebbuġa on the south-eastern side of Malta, is the islands' main cargo terminal. Malta Freeport is the 11th busiest container port in continent of Europe and 46th in the World with a trade volume of 2.3 million TEU's in 2008.

There is also a man-made harbour at Ċirkewwa. This is connected with Mġarr Harbour on Gozo by the Gozo ferry which makes numerous trips each day.

The only airport on Malta is Malta International Airport. It is built on the land formerly occupied by the RAF Luqa air base. Two further airfields at Ta' Qali and Ħal Far were operated during World War II and into the 1960s but are now closed. Today, Ta' Qali houses a national park, stadium, the Crafts Village visitor attraction and the Malta Aviation Museum. This museum preserves several aircraft, including Hurricane and Spitfire fighters that defended the island in World War II. The national airline is Air Malta.

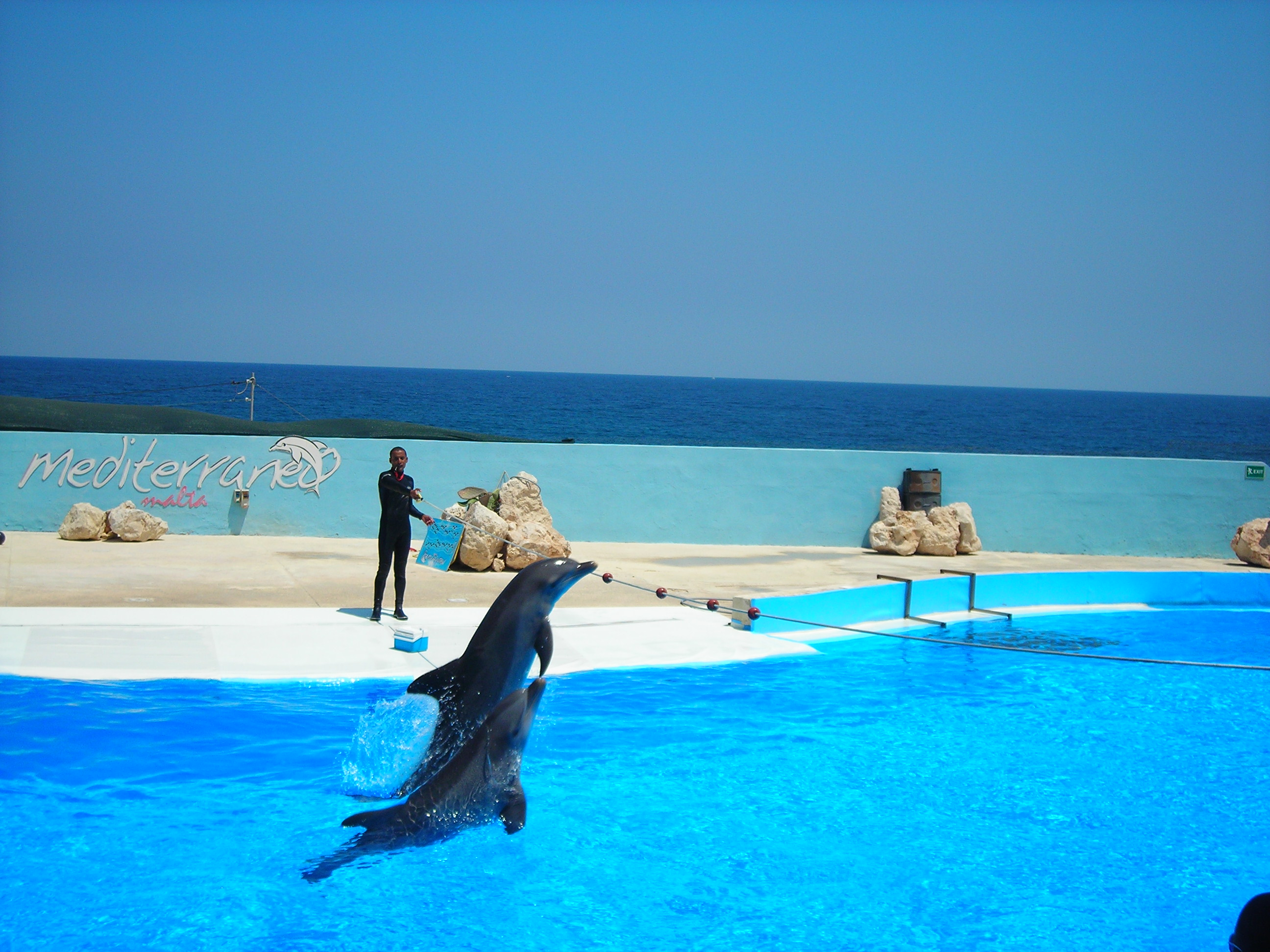
The dolphin show at Mediterraneo Marine Park

=== Tourism ===
Malta is a popular tourist destination, with 1.2 million tourists per year. Three times more tourists visit than there are residents. Tourism infrastructure has increased dramatically over the years and a number of good-quality hotels are present on the island, although overdevelopment and the destruction of traditional housing is of growing concern. An increasing number of Maltese now travel abroad on holiday.

In recent years, Malta has advertised itself as a medical tourism destination, and a number of health tourism providers are developing the industry. However, no Maltese hospital has undergone independent international healthcare accreditation. Malta is popular with British medical tourists, pointing Maltese hospitals towards seeking UK-sourced accreditation, such as with the Trent Accreditation Scheme. Dual accreditation with the American-oriented Joint Commission is necessary if hospitals in Malta wish to compete with the Far East and Latin America for medical tourists from the United States.

== Demographics ==
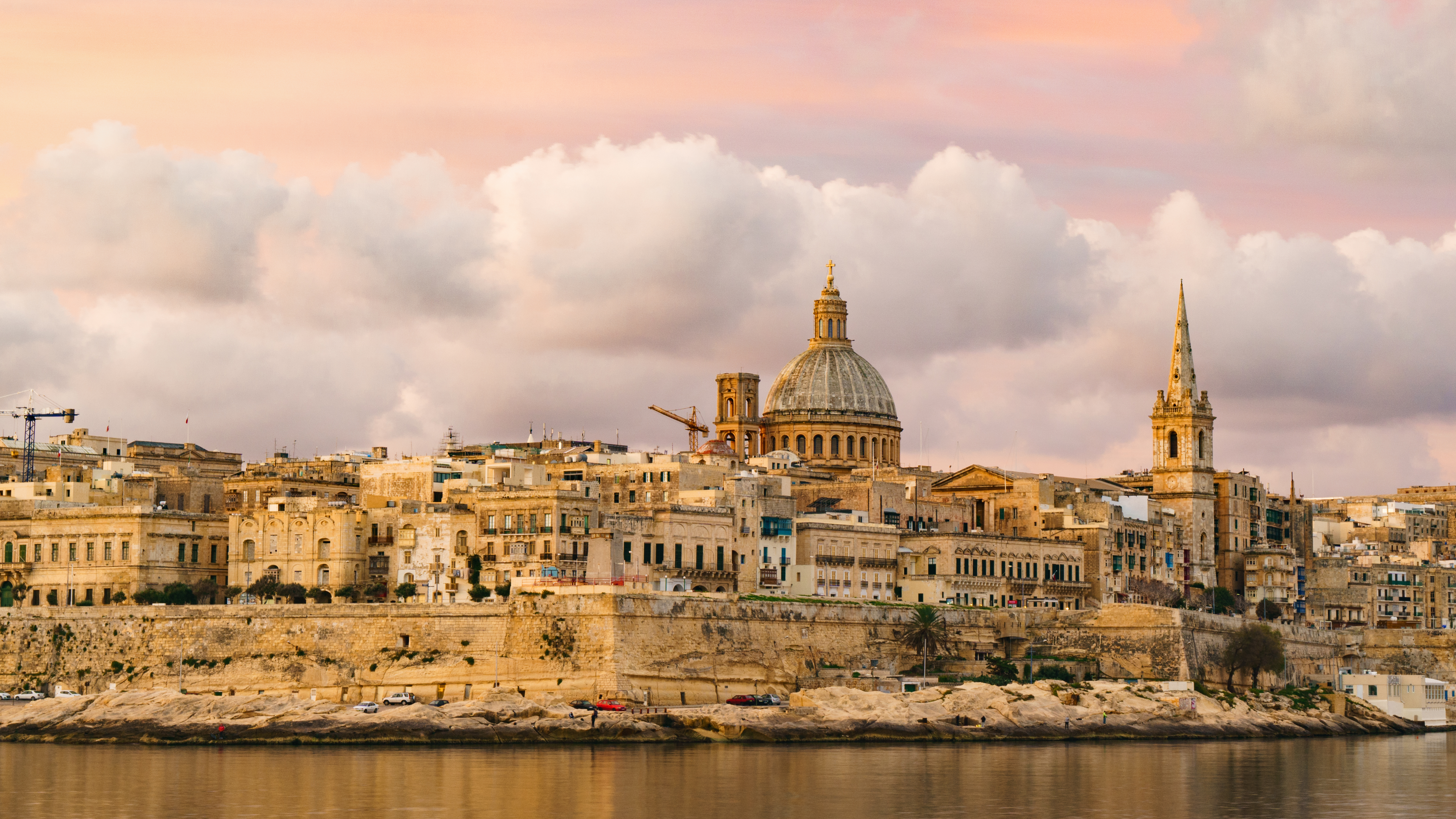
Valletta, Malta's capital city

Native Maltese people make up the majority of the island. However, there are minorities, the largest of which are British, many of whom have retired to Malta. According to the government's estimate of 2013, the population of Malta stood at 409,259 people which is about 91.6% of the country's total population. The largest city is Birkirkara with a population of 22,319. The capital Valletta has a relatively small population of 6675 people.

The main language spoken on Malta is the Maltese language, a Semitic language descended from the now defunct Siculo-Arabic dialect of southern Italy. The language has substantial borrowing from Sicilian, Italian, a little French, and more recently and increasingly, English. The hybrid character of Maltese was established by a long period of Maltese-Sicilian urban bilingualism gradually transforming rural speech and which ended in the early 19th century with Maltese emerging as the vernacular of the entire native population. The language includes different dialects that can vary greatly from one town to another or from one island to another.

The Eurobarometer states that 100% of the population speak Maltese. Also, 88% of the population speak English, 66% speak Italian, and 17% speak French. This widespread knowledge of second languages makes Malta one of the most multilingual countries in the European Union. A study collecting public opinion on what language was "preferred" discovered that 86% of the population express a preference for Maltese, 12% for English, and 2% for Italian. Still, Italian television channels from Italy-based broadcasters, such as Mediaset and RAI, reach Malta and remain popular.

=== Administrative divisions ===
Administrative divisions of Malta.

Malta has had a system of local government since 1993, based on the European Charter of Local Self-Government. The main island is divided into four regions, each having its own Regional Committee:

- Central Region
- Northern Region
- South Eastern Region
- Southern Region

Each region is further divided into local councils. Some hamlets have administrative committees, which are part of larger local councils. Currently there are 54 local councils and 13 administrative committees in Malta.

The island is also divided into five districts, but these serve primarily for statistical purposes:

- Northern District
- Northern Harbour District
- South Eastern District
- Southern Harbour District
- Western District

== See also ==
- Malta (country)
- Geography of Malta
- Gozo
- Comino
- Islands Cleanup campaign in Malta
