= Martyrdom of Paul =

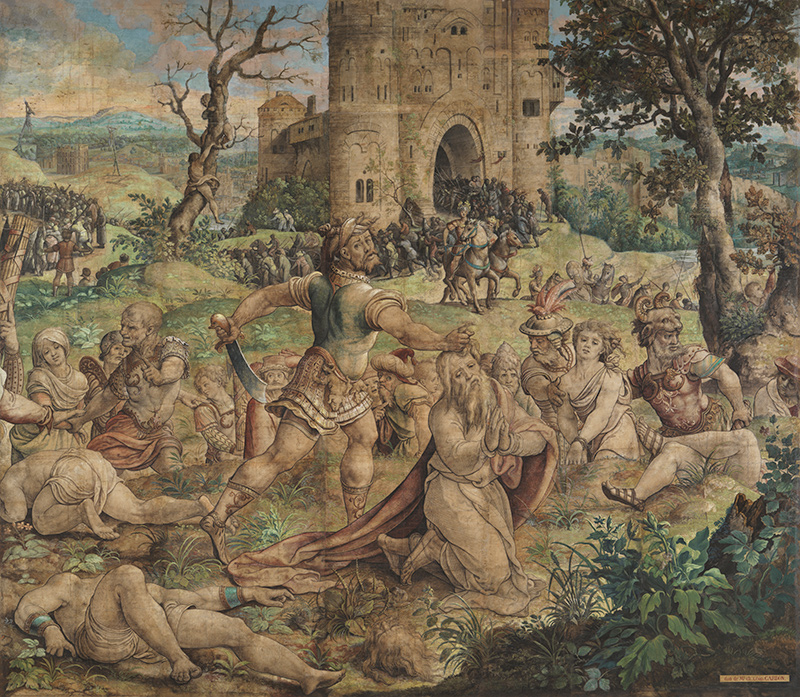
Martyrdom of Paul by Pieter Coecke van Aelst

Martyrdom of Paul may refer to:

- Martyrdom of the Holy Apostle Paul, a section of the Acts of Paul
- The death of Paul the Apostle
- Martyrdom of St. Paul, a 1556 painting by Jacopo Tintoretto
- Martyrdom of Paul, a c. 1529-1535 drawing by Pieter Coecke van Aelst

== See also ==
- Saint Paul (disambiguation)#Martyrs
