= Saint Paul's Island =

Saint Paul's Island or Saint Paul Island may refer to at least five islands.

- Île Saint-Paul, French Southern and Antarctic Lands
- St Paul's Island, Malta
- Saint Paul Island, Alaska
- St. Paul Island, Nova Scotia
- Or the former name for Nuns' Island
