= Sant Pau =

Sant Pau may refer to:

- Hospital de Sant Pau, Barcelona, Spain
- Sant Pau (restaurant), Sant Pol de Mar, Spain
- Saint-Paul-de-Vence, France, a commune spelled Sant Pau in Occitan

== See also ==
- Saint Paul (disambiguation)
