= Vézelin-sur-Loire =

- Commune
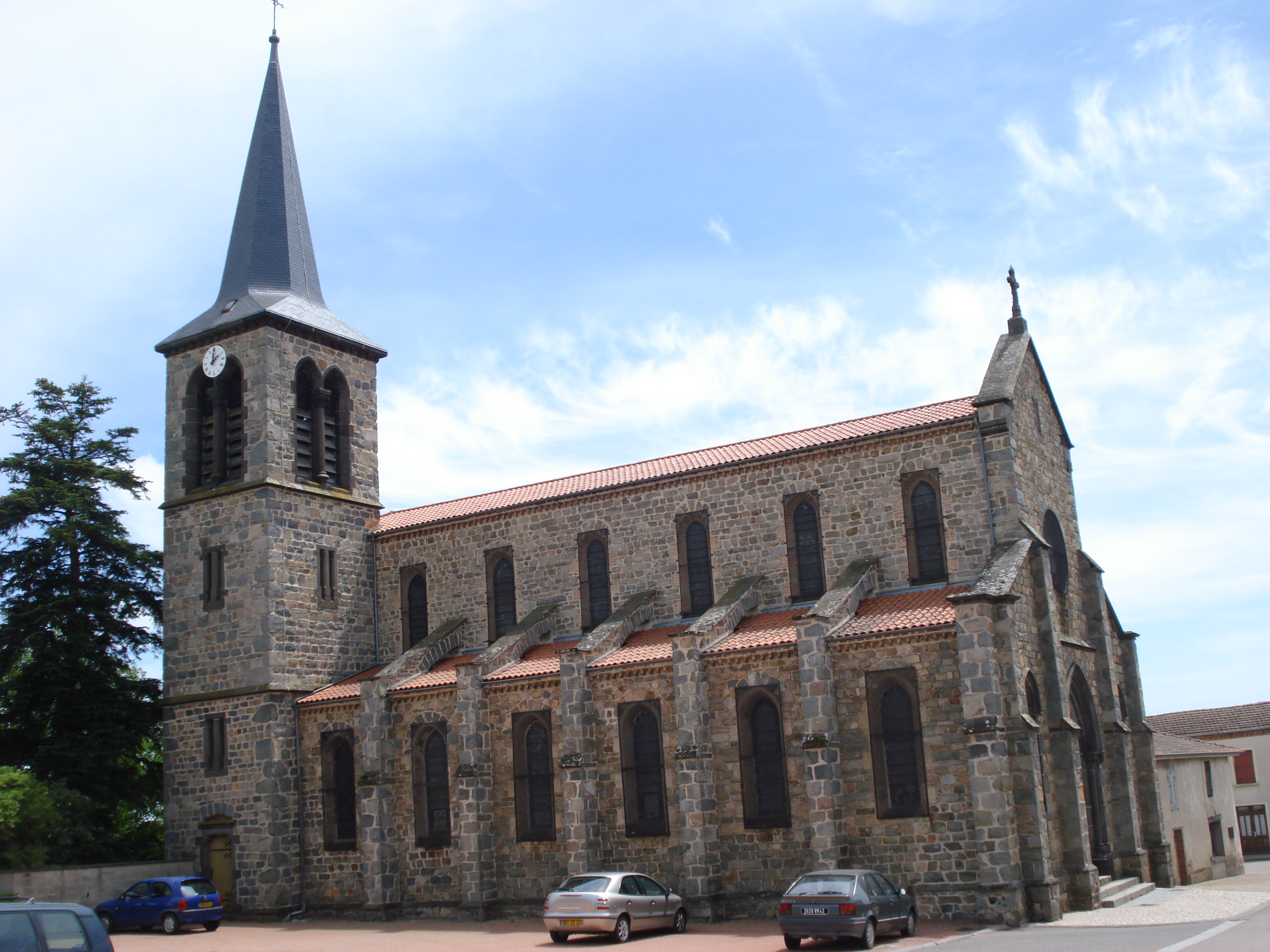
- Location of Vézelin-sur-Loire
- Location within France Location within Auvergne-Rhône-Alpes
- Coordinates: 45°53′09″N 4°05′10″E
- Country: France
- Region: Auvergne-Rhône-Alpes
- Department: Loire
- Arrondissement: Roanne
- Canton: Boën-sur-Lignon
- Intercommunality: Vals d'Aix et d'Isable

Government
  - Mayor (2020–2026): Georges Bernat
- Area^{1}: 39.36 km^{2} (15.20 sq mi)
- Elevation: 431 m (1,414 ft)
- Highest elevation: 482 m (1,581 ft)
- Lowest elevation: 288 m (945 ft)
- Population (2023): 811
  - Density: 20.6/km^{2} (53.4/sq mi)
- Time zone: UTC+01:00 (CET)
  - Summer (DST): UTC+02:00 (CEST)
- INSEE/Postal code: 42268 /42590
- ^{1} French Land Register data, which excludes lakes, ponds, glaciers > 1 km^{2} (0.386 sq mi or 247 acres) and river estuaries.

Vézelin-sur-Loire (Arpitan: Véselyins-sus-Lêre) is a commune in the Loire department in central France. It was established on 1 January 2019 by merger of the former communes of Saint-Paul-de-Vézelin (the seat), Amions and Dancé.

== See also ==
- Communes of the Loire department
