= San Paolo Apostolo =

San Paolo Apostolo may refer to the following churches:

- San Paolo Apostolo, Civitanova Marche, Macerata, Marche, Italy
- San Paolo Apostolo, Foligno, Perugia, Umbria, Italy
- San Paolo Apostolo, Siracusa, Sicily, Italy
- San Paolo Apostolo, Veroli, Frosinone, Lazio, Italy

== See also ==
- San Paolo (disambiguation)
- Paul the Apostle or Saul of Tarsus (c.5 – c.65 AD), Christian missionary
- St. Paul the Apostle Church (Manhattan), New York
- Chiesa di San Paolo apostolo, San Marino
