= Kristu tal-Baħħara =

Christ of the Mariners, underwater statue off Malta

Coordinates: 35.97°N 14.43°E

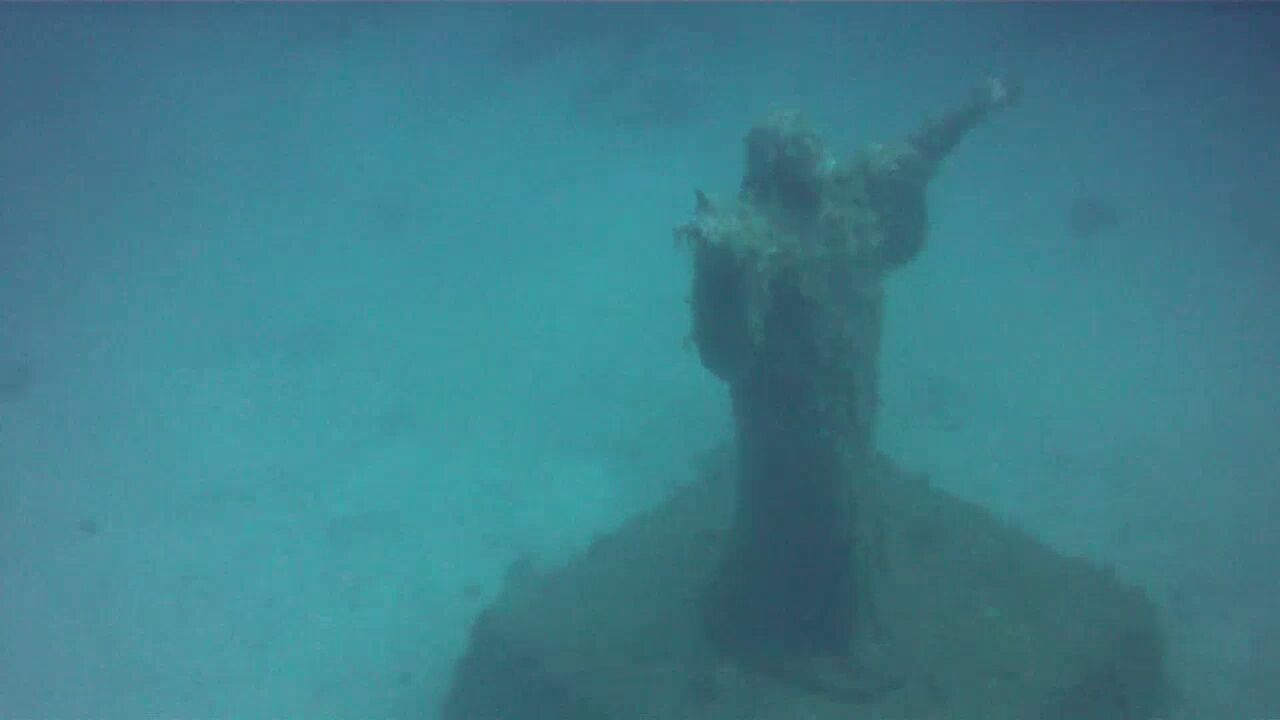
Kristu tal-Baħħara

Kristu tal-Baħħara (English: Christ of the Sailors) is an underwater statue of Jesus Christ two kilometers off the coast of Malta. It was made by Maltese sculptor Alfred Camilleri Cauchi from concrete covered fiberglass. Cauchi was commissioned to perform this work by a committee of divers led by Raniero Borg to honour the visit of Pope John Paul II to Malta in 1990. The statue is modeled on the bronze Christ of the Abyss at San Fruttuoso, Italy and is one of many copies in locations around the world.

The statue was originally sunk near St. Paul’s Islands in 1990. After 10 years the statue was moved from St. Paul's Bay to Qawra point because of deteriorating visibility in the water and a downturn in divers visiting the site. The statue lies below 35 metres of water and is close to the wreck of the MV Imperial Eagle, one of the ferryboats connecting Malta and Gozo, also a diving attraction.

== See also ==
- List of statues of Jesus
