= São Paulo (disambiguation) =

São Paulo (Portuguese for Saint Paul) is the capital city of the state of São Paulo in Brazil.

São Paulo may also refer to:

== Places ==
- São Paulo (state), one of the states of Brazil
- São Paulo Province, was one of the provinces of Brazil
- Greater São Paulo, the São Paulo region's urban and outlying urban areas
- The Saint Peter and Saint Paul Archipelago belonging to Brazil
- São Paulo das Missões, a municipality in the state of Rio Grande do Sul, Brazil
- São Paulo de Olivença, a municipality in the state of Amazonas, Brazil
- São Paulo (Lisbon), a freguesia (civil parish) of Lisbon, Portugal
- Luanda, the capital of Angola, formerly named São Paulo da Assunção de Loanda

== Sports ==
- São Paulo Futebol Clube, a Brazilian football team
- São Paulo Futebol Clube (AP), a Brazilian football team
- São Paulo Athletic Club, a defunct Brazilian football team founded by Charles Miller
- Sport Club São Paulo, a Brazilian football team
- Estádio Universitário São Paulo, a Brazilian football stadium
- Campo de São Paulo, an Angolan football stadium

== Ships ==
- NAe São Paulo, aircraft carrier and former flagship of the Brazilian Navy, scuttled in 2023
- Brazilian battleship São Paulo, dreadnought of the Brazilian Navy, sank in 1951

== In music ==
- "São Paulo" (song), a 2024 song by Canadian singer the Weeknd and Brazilian singer Anitta
- "São Paulo", a song by English rock band Guillemots which closes their 2006 debut album, Through the Windowpane
- "São Paulo", a song by American disco/funk band Chic from their self-titled album
- "São Paulo", a song by British trip hop band Morcheeba from their 2002 album Charango
- São Paulo, a 2016 album by Moka Only

== See also ==
- Saint Paul, Minnesota
- Saint Paul (disambiguation)
