= Amions =

- Part of Vézelin-sur-Loire
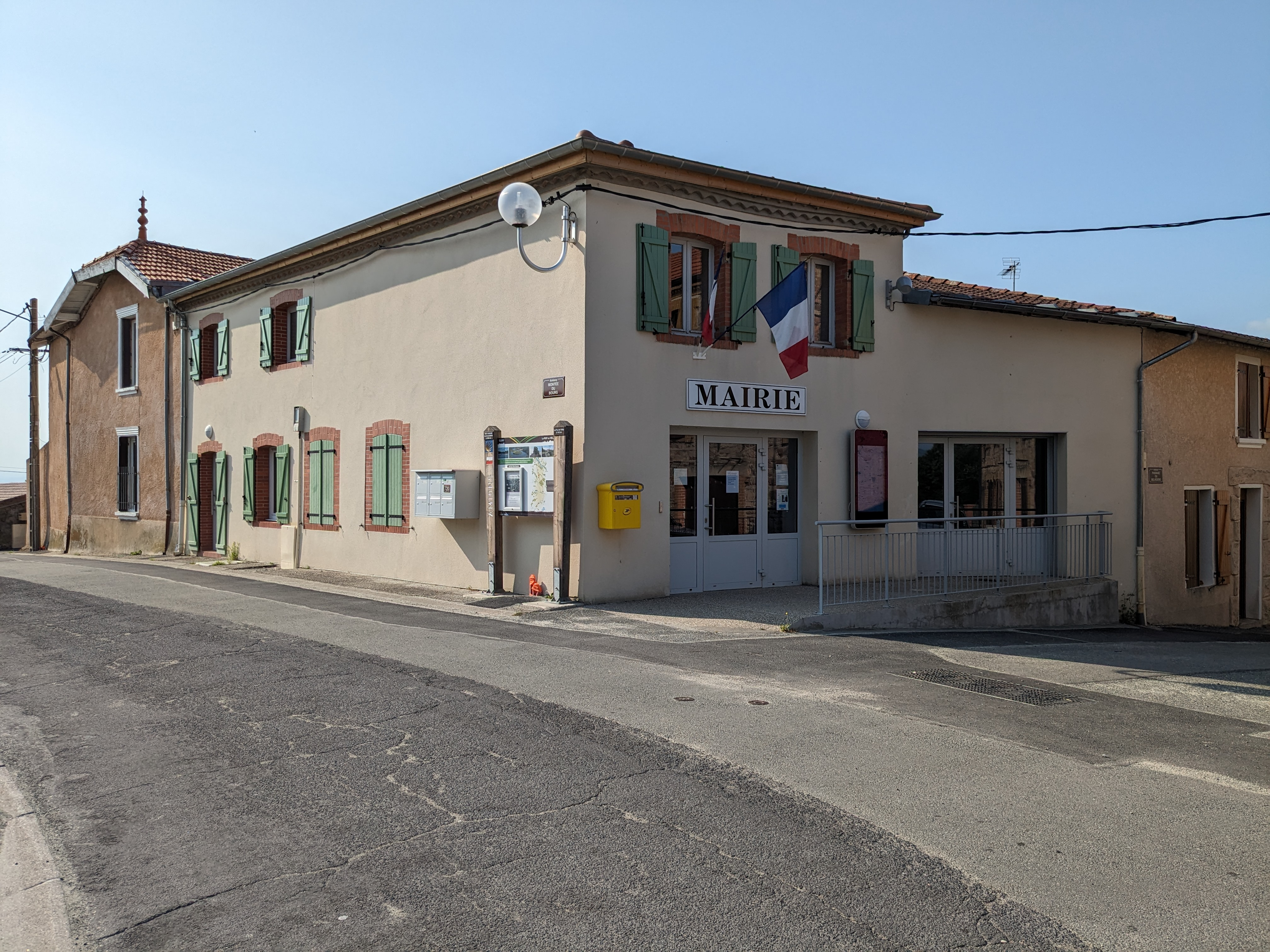
- Amions Town hall
- Location of Amions
- Location within France Location within Auvergne-Rhône-Alpes
- Coordinates: 45°52′44″N 4°02′05″E
- Country: France
- Region: Auvergne-Rhône-Alpes
- Department: Loire
- Arrondissement: Roanne
- Canton: Boën-sur-Lignon
- Commune: Vézelin-sur-Loire
- Area^{1}: 17.01 km^{2} (6.57 sq mi)
- Elevation: 470 m (1,540 ft)
- Highest elevation: 525 m (1,722 ft)
- Lowest elevation: 359 m (1,178 ft)
- Population (2023): 308
  - Density: 18.1/km^{2} (46.9/sq mi)
- Time zone: UTC+01:00 (CET)
  - Summer (DST): UTC+02:00 (CEST)
- Postal code: 42260
- ^{1} French Land Register data, which excludes lakes, ponds, glaciers > 1 km^{2} (0.386 sq mi or 247 acres) and river estuaries.

Amions is a former commune in the Loire department in central France. On 1 January 2019, it was merged into the new commune Vézelin-sur-Loire.

== See also ==
- Communes of the Loire department
