= St Paul Island =

Saint Paul Island can refer to:

- Île Saint-Paul, a small island in the French Southern Territories
- Saint Paul Island (Alaska), United States
- St. Paul Island (Nova Scotia), Canada
- Saint Peter and Saint Paul Archipelago, Brazil
- St Paul's Island, Malta
- Nuns' Island, originally Île Saint-Paul, part of Montreal city, Canada
