= Dancé, Loire =

Dancé
- Part of Vézelin-sur-Loire
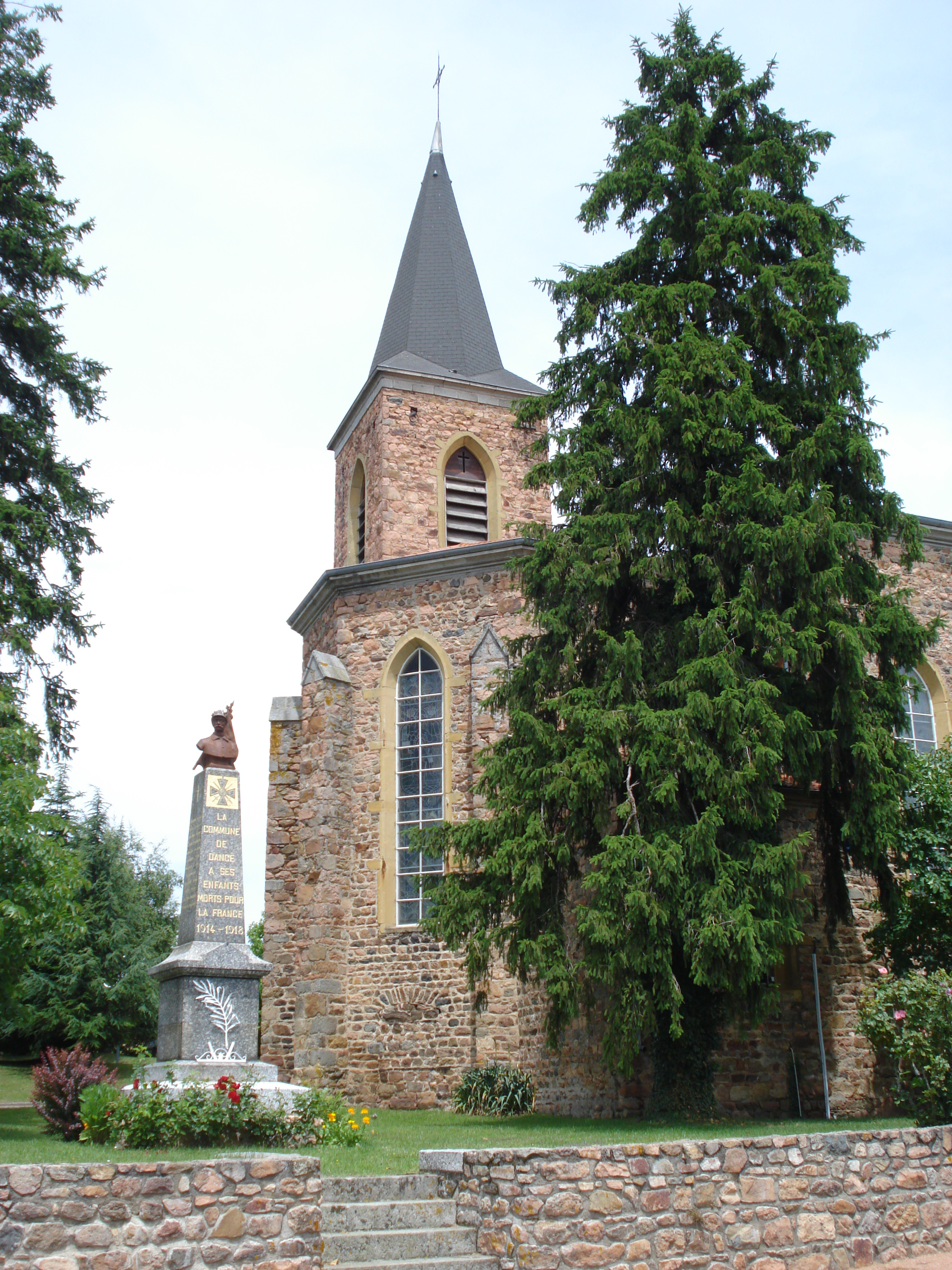
- Church and war memorial

- Coat of arms
- Location of Dancé
- Location within France Location within Auvergne-Rhône-Alpes
- Coordinates: 45°54′11″N 4°01′34″E
- Country: France
- Region: Auvergne-Rhône-Alpes
- Department: Loire
- Arrondissement: Roanne
- Canton: Boën-sur-Lignon
- Commune: Vézelin-sur-Loire
- Area^{1}: 8.83 km^{2} (3.41 sq mi)
- Elevation: 350 m (1,150 ft)
- Highest elevation: 583 m (1,913 ft)
- Lowest elevation: 283 m (928 ft)
- Population (2023): 177
  - Density: 20.0/km^{2} (51.9/sq mi)
- Time zone: UTC+01:00 (CET)
  - Summer (DST): UTC+02:00 (CEST)
- Postal code: 42260
- ^{1} French Land Register data, which excludes lakes, ponds, glaciers > 1 km^{2} (0.386 sq mi or 247 acres) and river estuaries.

Dancé (French pronunciation: [dɑ̃se]) is a former commune in the Loire department in central France. On 1 January 2019, it was merged into the new commune Vézelin-sur-Loire.

== See also ==
- Communes of the Loire department
