= Islands Cleanup campaign =

Environmental campaign in Malta

Since 2020, the Ministry for the Environment of Malta has been organizing the Islands Cleanup Campaign in collaboration with Project Green and Saving Our Blue organizations. This initiative is held annually with the aim of raising public awareness about the importance of protecting Malta's valleys and coastal areas. Private companies, schools, non-governmental organizations, and various other groups are encouraged to register their local cleaning campaigns to contribute to a cleaner environment. Participants are provided with necessary equipment, including gloves, bags, waste vehicles, and safety instructions to ensure a safe and efficient cleaning process. Many large companies have supported the initiative with donations, such as Meridian Gaming, Heritage Malta, and others.

== Participation and contribution ==
In the 2023 initiative, over 500 volunteers from 20 governmental bodies, non-governmental organizations, and private companies participated. During the 2022 campaign, over 2,000 tons of waste were collected, resulting in the planting of 4,000 new trees. Cleaning campaigns are organized during the summer season, with two trees planted for every ton of waste collected.

=== Campaign goals ===
The campaign aims to achieve a lasting impact on the environment. Participants are assisted in weighing the waste they collect during their local campaigns and separating it on-site according to current waste separation regulations to ensure the recycling of all recyclable materials. All participating organizations receive a certificate for their efforts in creating a better and healthier environment.

== Establishment of Project Green ==
In 2022, the Ministry for the Environment of Malta announced plans to establish Project Green, a new agency for implementing the government's seven-year plan to provide more public gardens, parks, and other open spaces for families in Malta and the island of Gozo.

=== Goals and activities ===
Miriam Dalli, the Minister for the Environment, Energy, and Enterprise, announced her plans in Parliament during the debate on the ministry's budget estimate for 2023. The agency is entrusted with a seven-year plan to invest €700 million in creating, maintaining, and empowering public gardens and other open spaces in Malta and Gozo, so that all residents can enjoy green recreational spaces, regardless of where they live on the island.

== Community involvement ==
Project Green will engage residents, workers, and companies in the communities where projects are carried out, sharing their ideas and aspirations for these projects. The ministry also aims to view green open spaces differently through Project Green. The organization will collaborate with other government bodies, local councils, non-governmental organizations, and other entities already working on greening Malta, uniting them in achieving this important goal. All interested parties can register for participation free of charge.
