= San Paolo Maggiore =

San Paolo Maggioreo may refer to:

- San Paolo Maggiore, Bologna, church in Bologna, Italy
- San Paolo Maggiore, Naples, church in Naples, Italy
