= Saint-Paul-de-Vézelin =

- Part of Vézelin-sur-Loire
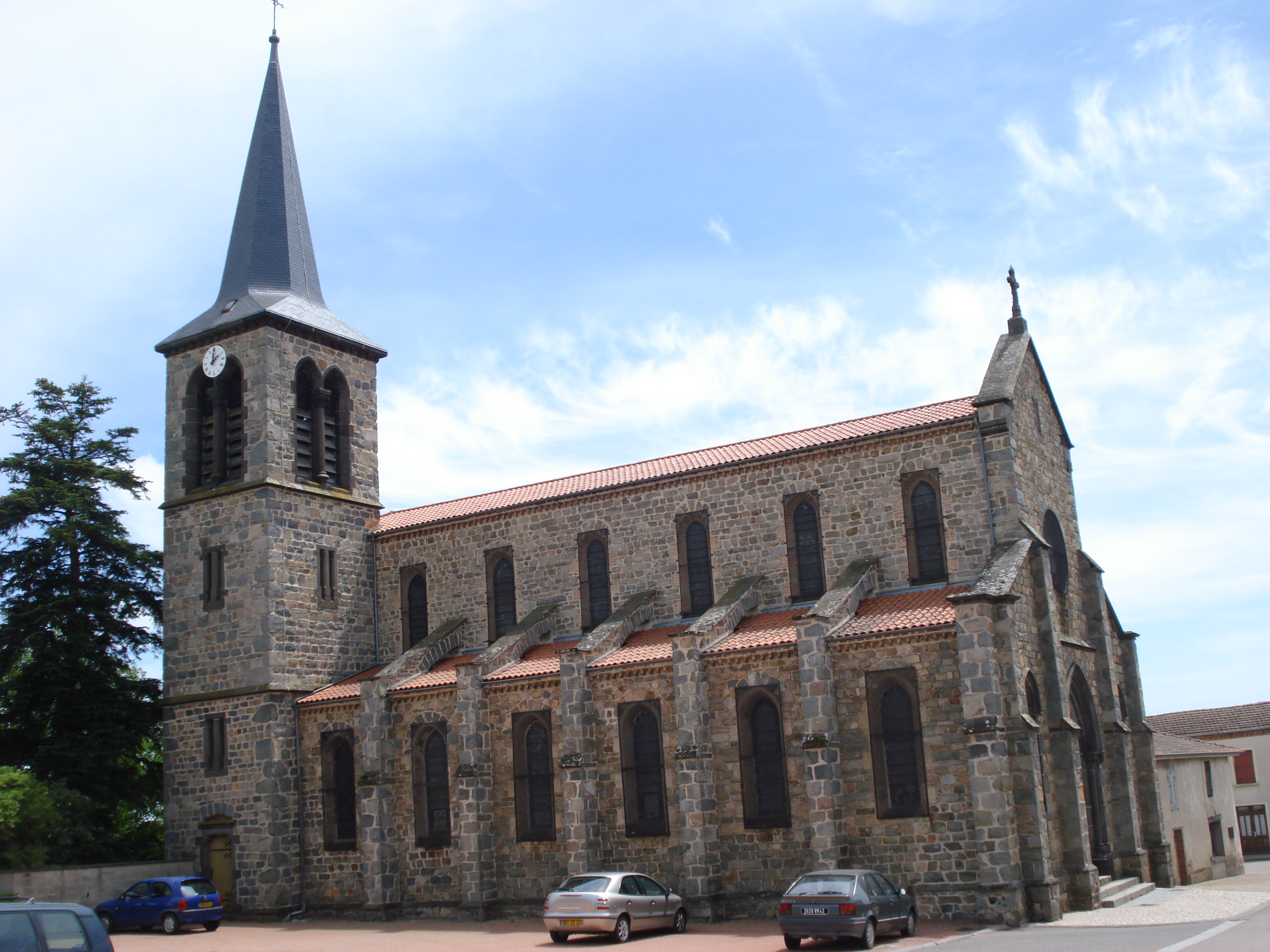
- The church in Saint-Paul-de-Vézelin

- Coat of arms
- Location of Saint-Paul-de-Vézelin
- Location within France Location within Auvergne-Rhône-Alpes
- Coordinates: 45°53′09″N 4°05′10″E
- Country: France
- Region: Auvergne-Rhône-Alpes
- Department: Loire
- Arrondissement: Roanne
- Canton: Boën-sur-Lignon
- Commune: Vézelin-sur-Loire
- Area^{1}: 13.52 km^{2} (5.22 sq mi)
- Elevation: 431 m (1,414 ft)
- Highest elevation: 482 m (1,581 ft)
- Lowest elevation: 288 m (945 ft)
- Population (2022): 328
  - Density: 24.3/km^{2} (62.8/sq mi)
- Time zone: UTC+01:00 (CET)
  - Summer (DST): UTC+02:00 (CEST)
- Postal code: 42590
- ^{1} French Land Register data, which excludes lakes, ponds, glaciers > 1 km^{2} (0.386 sq mi or 247 acres) and river estuaries.

Saint-Paul-de-Vézelin (French pronunciation: [sɛ̃ pɔl də vezlɛ̃]; Arpitan: Sant-Pol-de-Véselyins) is a former commune in the Loire department in central France. On 1 January 2019, it was merged into the new commune Vézelin-sur-Loire.

== See also ==
- Communes of the Loire department
