= Campo de São Paulo =

Sports venue in Luanda, Angola

Coordinates: 8.8322°S 13.2606°E

- Interactive map of Campo de São Paulo
- Address: Luanda; Angola
- Owner: Angolan Football Federation
- Capacity: 5,000
- Type: Stadium
- Current use: None

Campo de São Paulo is a multi-use stadium located in Bairro dos Congolenses, Luanda, Angola. The stadium has a capacity of 5,000 people, and previously hosted Girabola (Angolan national football league) matches prior to falling into disuse and disrepair. In 2017, the Angolan Football Federation acquired the stadium with plans to convert it to a training center for Angola's national football teams.
