= St Paul's Island =

Small island off Selmun near the north-east of the main island of Malta

Saint Paul's Island(s)
Native name: Selmunett Gżira/Gżejjer ta' San Pawl
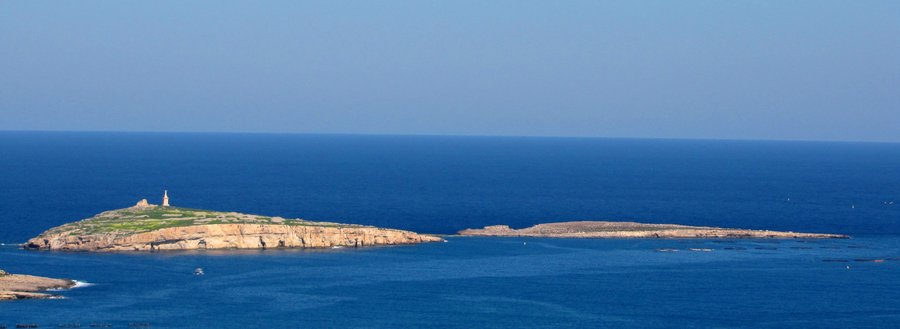
- View of Saint Paul's Islands
- Interactive map of Saint Paul's Island(s)

Geography
- Location: off Malta, south of Sicily, Mediterranean Sea
- Coordinates: 35°57′55″N 14°24′2″E
- Archipelago: Maltese islands
- Area: 0.101 km^{2} (0.039 sq mi)
- Coastline: 0.9 km (0.56 mi)

Administration
- Malta

Demographics
- Population: 0

St Paul's Island (Maltese: Il-Gżejjer ta' San Pawl), also known as Selmunett, is a small island off Selmun, Mellieħa near the north of the island of Malta. St Paul's Island is sometimes split into two islands by a shallow strait, and it is therefore sometimes referred to in the plural as St Paul's Islands. St Paul's Island has been uninhabited since World War II, and it is the second largest uninhabited island of Malta, having an area of 0.1 square kilometres (0.04 square miles).

== History ==
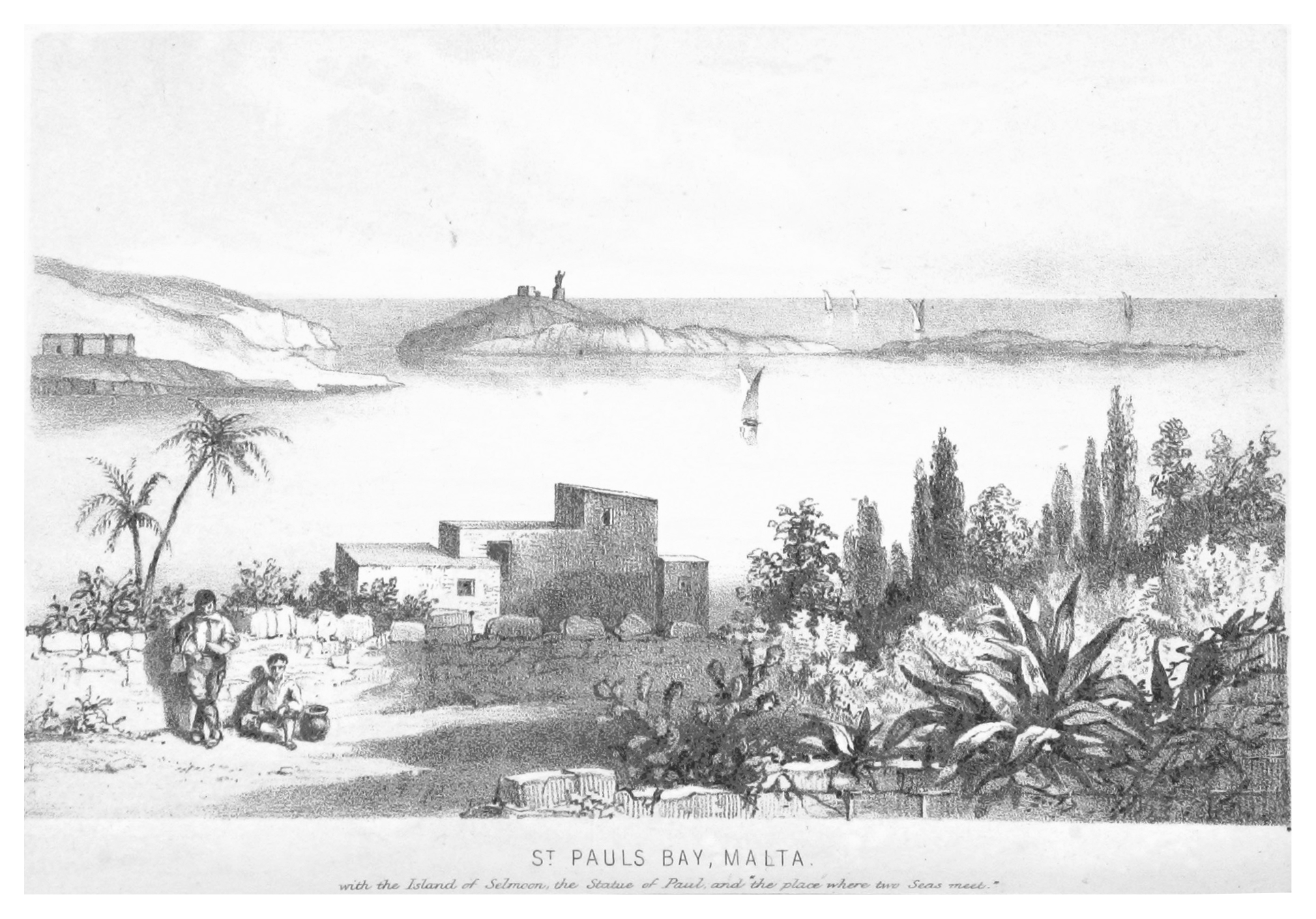
View of Saint Paul's Island in 1861

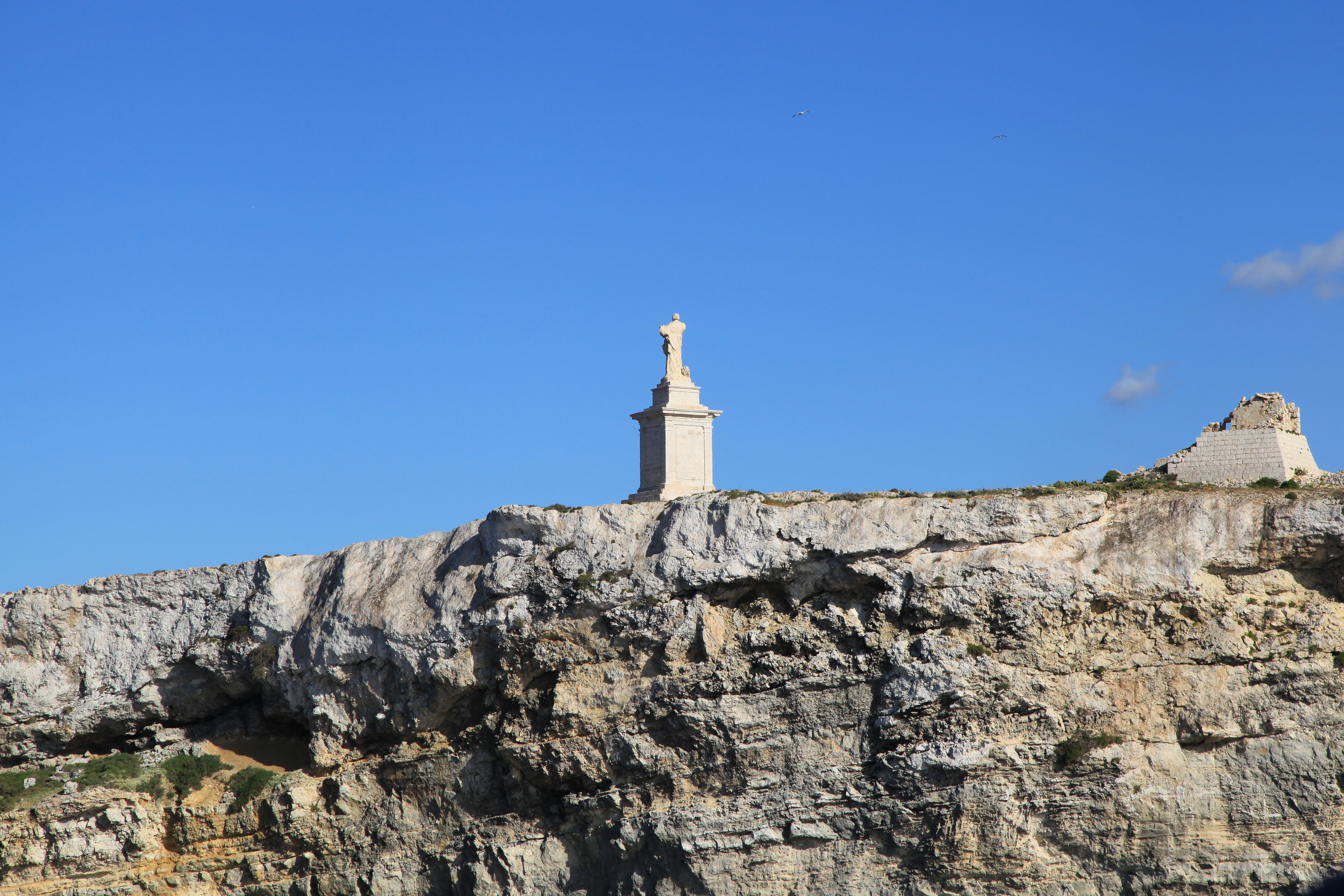
The statue of Saint Paul and the ruins of the tower.

The Acts of the Apostles tell the story of how Paul the Apostle was shipwrecked on an island which Chapter 28 identifies as Malta while on his way to Rome to face charges in 60 AD. Traditionally, St Paul's Island was identified as the location for this shipwreck, but this has been disputed. The artefacts discovered on the seabed outside Salina Bay—including the largest Roman-period anchor (a lead anchor stock) ever discovered worldwide, as well as an anchor bearing the Egyptian gods Isis and Sarapis—strongly indicate that Salina Bay is the shipwreck site. Salina Bay lies in close proximity to St Paul’s Bay, traditionally identified as the location of the shipwreck, and is also near San Pawl Milqi, a Roman-period estate associated with olive oil production and widely believed to have belonged to Publius, the Protos (governor) of the island. Publius, who was baptised by the Apostle Paul, later became the first bishop of Melita (Malta).

Until 1575, the islands were named after the Salomone family, who owned a nearby land in Mellieħa also called Selmun; the islands were named on maps as Isola Salomone and Isola Salomonetto and interpreted by the Maltese as Selmun and Selmunett. On other maps, the islands were referred to as Selmun's Islands and The Scroll of Selmun. In 1576, Marco di Maria was being chased by Barbary corsairs off the coast of Malta. He navigated his vessel through the narrow channel between St Paul's Island and Malta, but when the pirates followed him they ran aground and were captured. As a result of this, the Grandmaster Jean de la Cassière gave St Paul's Islands to di Maria and the islands started to be called Tal-Barba Marku.

After the death of Marco, as decreed by the Grand Master, the island passed to his family. It first went to his son Giovanni de Maria and later to the nephew of Marco who was the son of Giavanni, who was named Narduccio de Maria. Narduccio lost his life in a battle at sea in a fight against the Ottomans. The island was then transferred to the Order of Saint John. Sometime after 1649 a tower was built on the island by Grand Master Giovanni Paolo Lascaris. The tower was part of a contract, for the exchange of the island with the Casa della Giornata (now the site of the Royal Opera House) in Valletta which belonged to Michel de Torellas, the Prior of Catalonia.

In 1844 a prominent statue of Saint Paul was erected on the island. It was sculpted by Segismondo Dimech from Valletta and Salvatore Dimech from Lija. The statue was officially inaugurated and blessed on 21 September 1845. It was restored by Din l-Art Ħelwa a number of times, first in 1996, then in 2007, in 2014, and 2015.

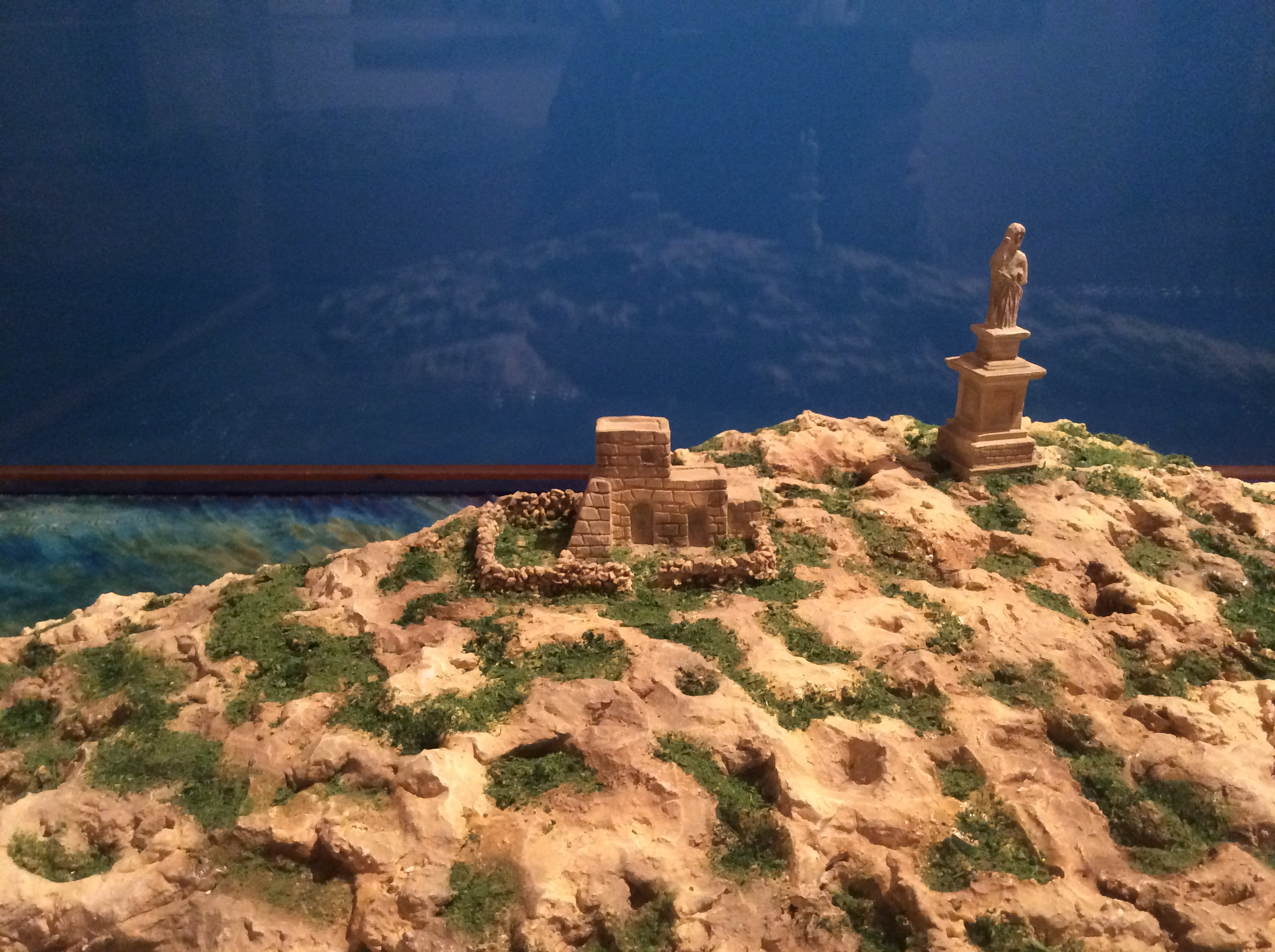
Model of Ta' Bajdafin Farmhouse, at the National Museum of Natural History

Until the 1930s, a farmer called Vincenzo Borg, nicknamed Ta' Bajdafin, lived on the island in the tower built by Grandmaster Lascaris. He converted it and used it as a farmhouse. Borg abandoned the dwelling, and the fields on the island, just before World War II started. The tower was a three-chambered structure with a heavily buttressed wall at its lower level. It was built similar to other Lascaris towers. Since it was abandoned, the upper room has collapsed and the structure is now in ruins.

Pope John Paul II visited the island by boat during his visit to Malta in 1990. In the same year, a statue named Kristu tal-Baħħara was sunk near St. Paul's Island. After 10 years, the statue was moved from St. Paul's Bay to Qawra point because of deteriorating visibility in the water and a decline in divers visiting the site.

== Geography ==
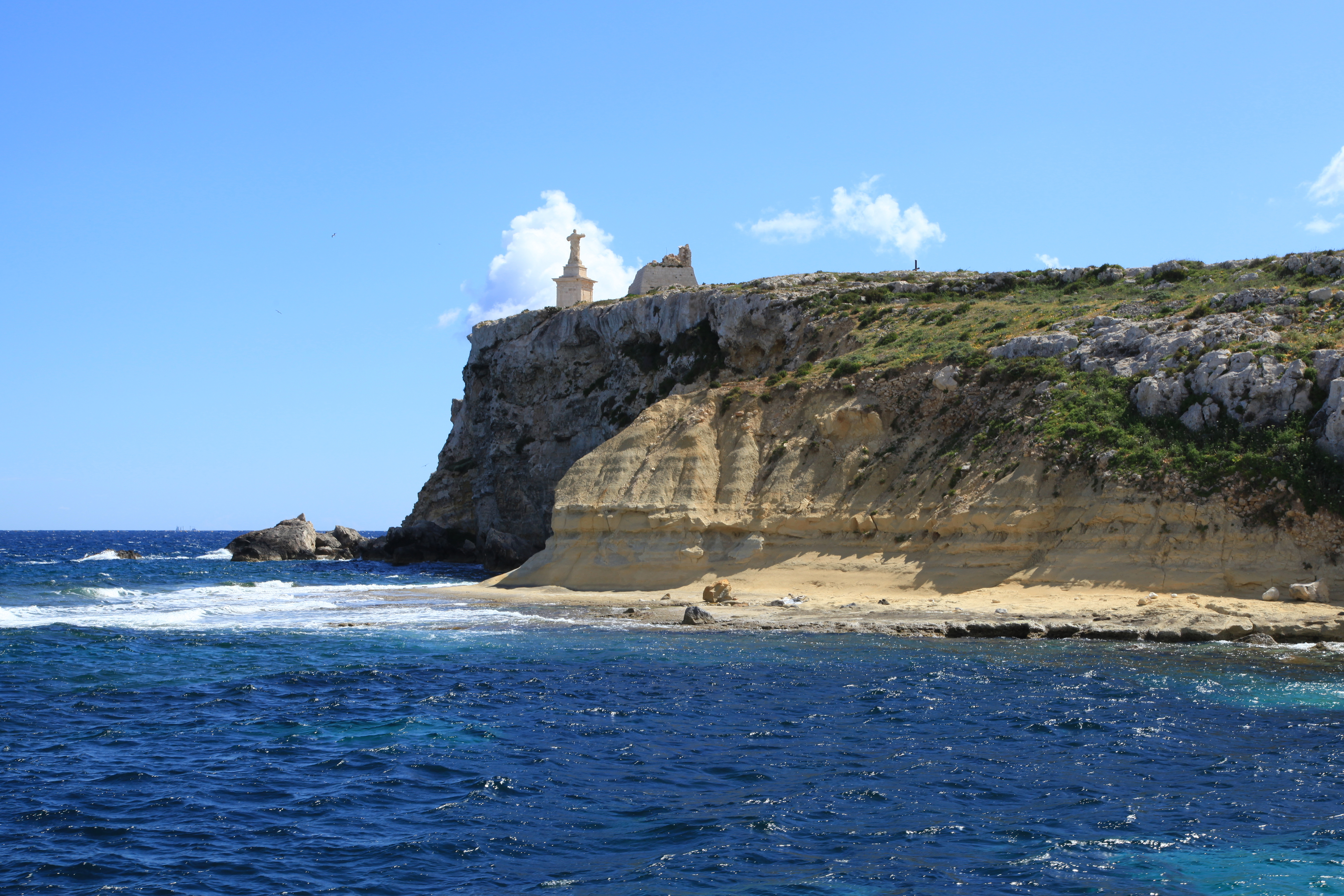
Cliffs on the northern side of the main island.

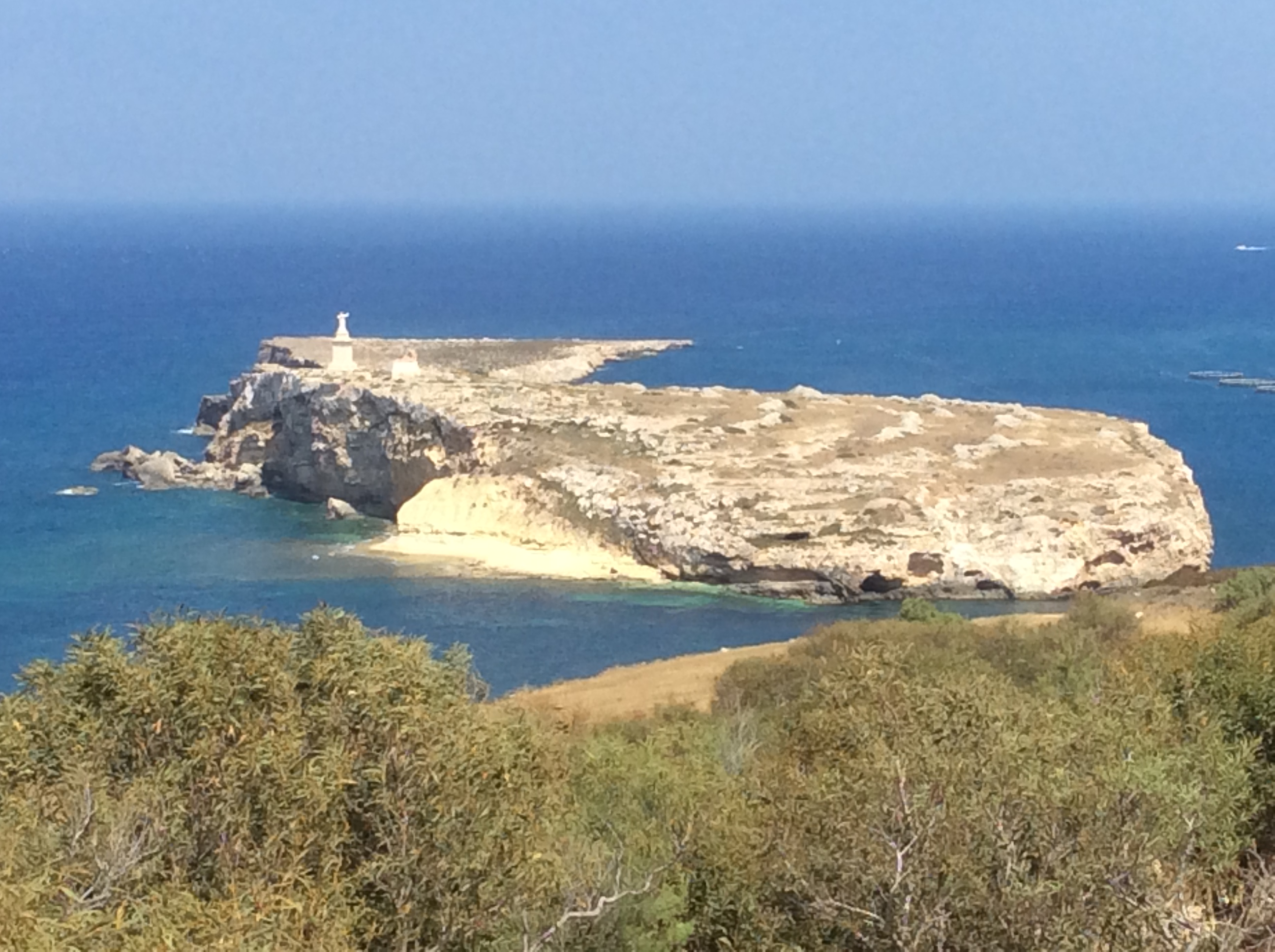
The island as seen from Mellieħa

Saint Paul's Islands lie about 100 metres off the coast of Mellieħa, Malta. The island can split into two islands by a shallow isthmus according to the sea level, and when they are split the larger island on the west is known as Saint Paul's Island while the smaller one on the east is known as Quartz Island. Both islands are made of upper coralline limestone.

Saint Paul's Island's landscape is a maritime garigue dominated by golden samphire, Maltese fleabane and other species. Quartz Island is more exposed and has less vegetation than the main island.

A population of the land snail Trochoidea spratti can be found on the islands. Wild rabbits used to live on the island but the population died off due to disease. A subspecies of the Maltese wall lizard known as Podarcis filfolensis kieselbachi also lived there but the population apparently became extinct in 2005.
