= Peruvian Amazon Company =

Rubber boom company known for slavery

- Formerly: Peruvian Amazon Rubber Company Ltd.
- Type: Private
- Industry: Exportation of natural rubber
- Founded: 26 September 1907; 118 years ago
- Founder: Julio César Arana
- Fate: Liquidated in 1913
- Headquarters: Iquitos, Peru
- Total equity: £1,000,000 (1907)

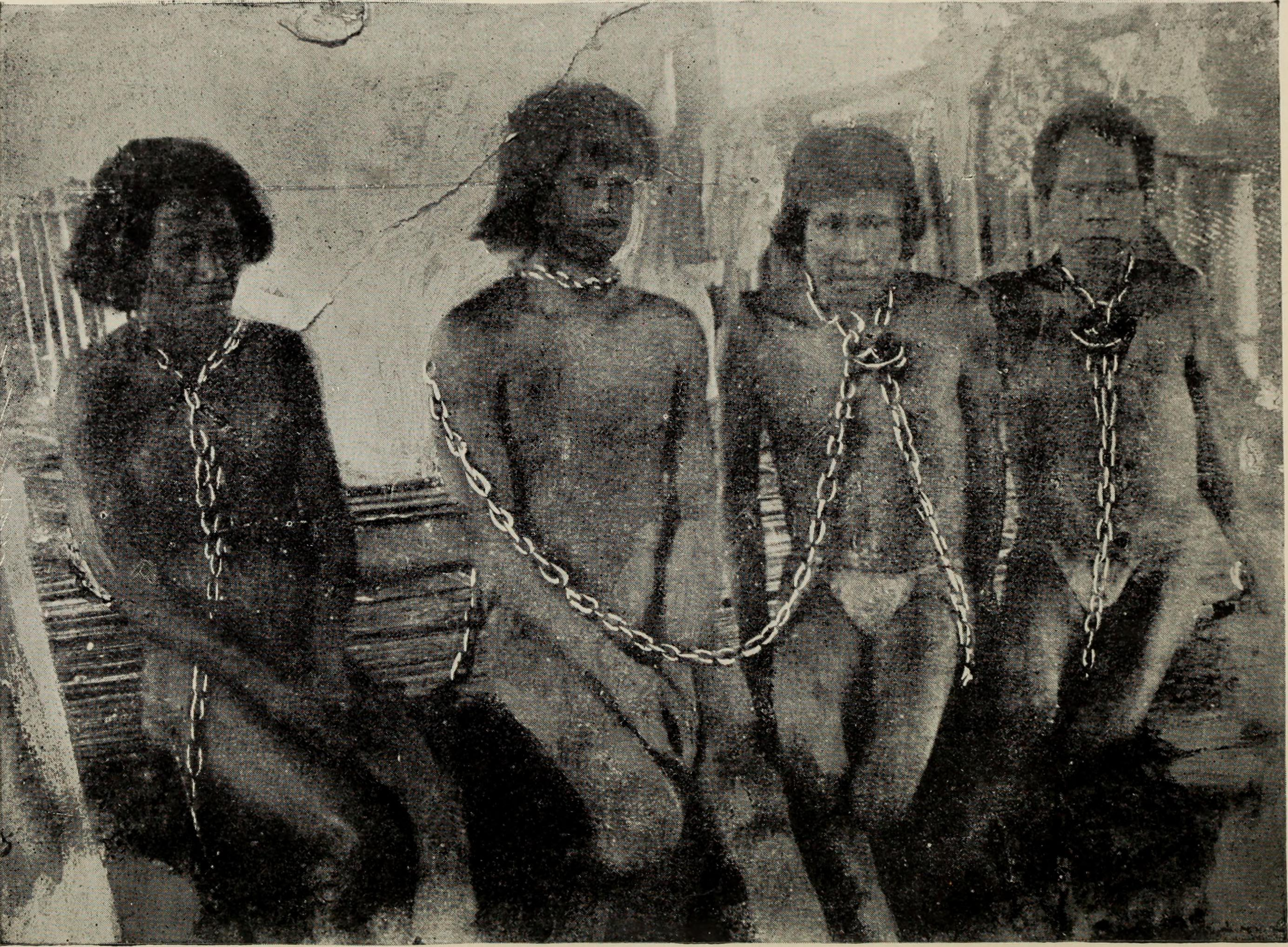
Natives imprisoned by the Peruvian Amazon Company, photograph first published in 1912

The Peruvian Amazon Company, also known as the Anglo-Peruvian Amazon Rubber Co., was a rubber boom company that operated in Peru during the late 1800s and early 1900s. Headquartered in Iquitos, it gained notoriety for its harsh treatment of Indigenous workers in the Amazon Basin, whom its field forces subjected to conditions akin to slavery. The company's exploitative practices were brought to light in 1912 through an investigative report by British consul-general Roger Casement and an article and book by journalist W. E. Hardenburg.

The company of the Arana Brothers, which had sought capital in London, merged with the PAC in 1907. Peruvian rubber baron Julio César Arana ran the company in Peru. British members of the board of directors included Sir John Lister-Kaye, 3rd Baronet.

The company operated in the area of the Putumayo River, a river that flows from the Andes to join the Amazon River deep in the tropical jungle. This area, inhabited by numerous Indigenous peoples, was contested at the time among Peru, Colombia, and Ecuador. Some of the Indigenous populations that were affected by the Peruvian Amazon Company during the Putumayo genocide include the Witoto (Huitoto), Bora, Ocaina, and Andoque tribes.

== Origins of the company ==
The Cinchona boom and the start of the rubber boom incentivised exploration as well as settlement of previously uncolonised land in the Amazon. One of the first prominent expeditions into the Putumayo River basin during the 19th century started as a business venture by future Colombian president Rafael Reyes in 1875. The group found the region richly inhabited by rubber trees and an abundant potential work force to collect that rubber. Members of that original expedition like Benjamin Larrañaga, Crisóstomo Hernández, the Calderón brothers, and other Colombians established themselves along the Putumayo.

In 1896, Julio César Arana, the owner of a small peddling business based in Iquitos, began trading with Colombian settlers in the region. Shortly after, a business partnership was arranged between Arana and Larrañaga who at the time owned La Chorrera along the Igara Paraná River. Arana adopted the common practices of the local Colombians in the region at the time, who made it their business to enslave and exploit the natives as a work force to extract rubber. Often, if a weight quota imposed by the caucheros was not met by the indigenous rubber collectors, the resulting punishment ranged from execution, dismemberment, starvation, or potentially flagellation where the victim is left to die from their festering wounds. The Huitotos, Resígaro, the Andokes, the Boras, and other tribes were forced to work for Arana and other rubber companies he associated with in the region.

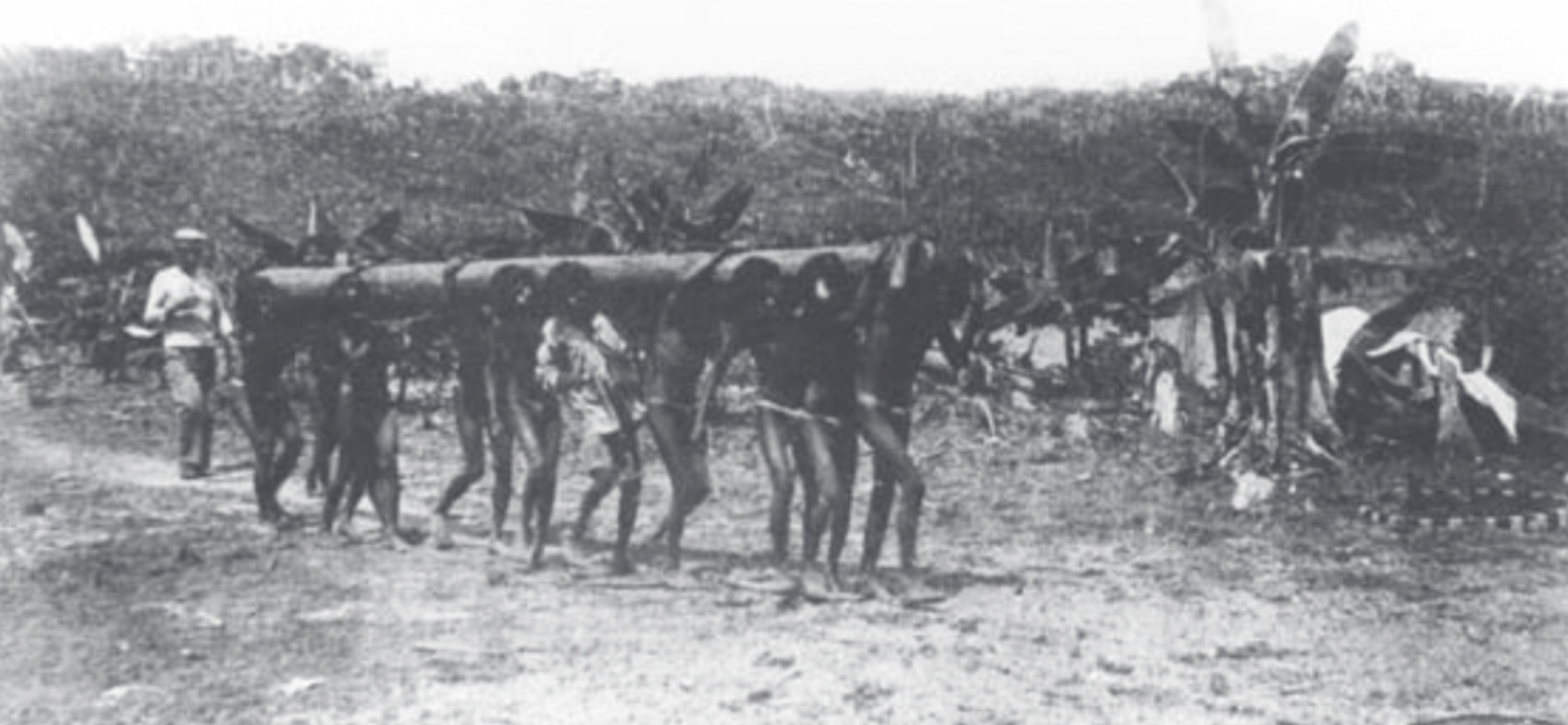
A group of Huitoto natives forced to work on a plantation belonging to Julio César Arana.

Before the rubber boom reached the Putumayo, the city exporting the largest amount of rubber from the Amazon was Pará on the coast of Brazil. Under the influence of Arana, Iquitos claimed that title. In 1898, a commercial house was established in Iquitos by Arana. At the time, the city was already a major center of export for Amazonian rubber. The following year, the Booth Steamship Co. of Liverpool established a monthly connection from Iquitos to Liverpool and New York. In a few years, Arana would be shipping a third of the total rubber exports in Iquitos to Liverpool, Le Havre, Hamburg, and New York.

In 1900, Arana was exporting 35,000 pounds of rubber a year. By 1906, he was exporting 1.4 million pounds of rubber. Sometime in 1900, the Larrañaga, Arana y compañia was formed from the partnership with the Larrañagas. Shortly after Benjamin Larrañaga's death in December 1903, Arana bought out Rafael Larrañaga's share from the company: "taking advantage of their ignorance and stupidity to rob them scandalously". Arana employed manipulation, deceit, and force to acquire the property of other entrepreneurs in the area. The Calderón brothers at El Encanto and Hipólito Perez, who owned Argelia, lost their property to Arana due to manipulative business arrangements. Subsequently, José Cabrera, the owner of Nueva Granada on the Caraparaná River, was coerced into selling his estate at a disadvantageous price to Arana. He was intimidated "by threats of killing him, by shooting at him from ambush, by forcibly taking away his Indians, and by the other methods for which this company is known".

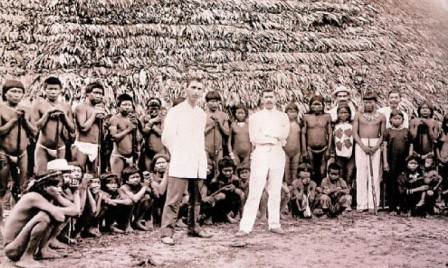
Employees of Julio César Arana stand in front of their enslaved Indigenous workers. Photograph circa 1912.

In 1905, Arana travelled to London with the aim of attracting investment. The Peruvian Amazon Rubber Company, Ltd. was registered in London on 26 September 1907, with the assistance of English investors and a capital of £1,000,000. This new company acquired the assets of Arana's previous firm, J.C. Arana y Hermanos. The following year, "rubber" was dropped from the name, making it the Peruvian Amazon Company, Ltd. At that time, the company had headquarters branches in Iquitos, managed by Julio's brother-in-law Pablo Zumaeta. Zumaeta was responsible for the operations in the Putumayo and the outflow of rubber. Another branch in Manaus was managed by Julio's brother, Lizardo Arana.

=== The Putumayo estates ===
While the Peruvian Amazon Company owned territory along the Purus, Napo and Caqueta Rivers, the enterprise's most profitable rubber stations were established in the Putumayo River basin. During the rubber boom, Peru, Colombia, Brazil and Ecuador had disputed claims on the Putumayo River basin, the territory owned by the Peruvian Amazon Company was specifically contested by Peru and Colombia. The presence of Arana's company in this area reinforced Peru's claim to the territory, as the Peruvian agents of the company were occupying the land and the company had monopolized the region, essentially removing Colombian competition from the area by 1908. The company exerted such a level of control over the Putumayo River basin that any traveler that desired to traverse the territory would have to depend on the company for transportation, as well as permission to access the territory.

The Peruvian Amazon Company's territory in the Putumayo was part of the Amazon rainforest and a small mountain range. Walter E. Hardenburg, Roger Casement, and several other sources of first hand information described territory in the Putumayo as difficult to navigate on land. Both Hardenburg and Casement implicated Peruvian government officials in the region with accepting bribes from the Peruvian Amazon Company, Casement also noted that several of those officials were simultaneously employed by Arana's company while holding government positions. (Note: Hardenburg wrote in his 1912 book that the twenty-one Peruvian constables employed on the Putumayo River had all been bribed by English traders, presumably the Peruvian Amazon Company, and in return they did not report criminal activity in the area. Several of the individuals that Casement noted were simultaneously employed by the government and Arana include Victor Macedo, Amadeo Burga, and a "R. Coloma".) The company's general manager at La Chorrera, Victor Macedo, even held the position of Justice of the Peace for Peru in the Putumayo River basin. The American consul-general to Iquitos in 1907, Charles C. Eberhardt, was able to obtain a list that contains the documented numbers for the indigenous populations throughout La Chorrera's district prior to December 3 of 1907. The list, contained in one of Eberhardt's consular dispatches, was reported with the following figures:

Arrangement of sections under La Chorrera's management
Name of section.	Number of foremen	Number of assistants.	Number[of indigenous people](approximate).	Names of Indians
Ultimo Retiro	1	14	650	Huitotos
Entre Rios	1	14	650	Do.
Occidente	1	6	700	Do.
Sur	1	4	300	Do.
Atenas	1	8	600	Do.
Oriente	1	8	500	Ocainos.
Savana	1	12	1,000	Boras.
Matanzas	1	18	5,000	Andoques.
Abysinia Morelia	1	35	1,600	Boras
El Pama Santa Catalina	1	17	800	Do.

=== Harvesting of rubber ===
Within the Putumayo region, two distinct types of rubber were produced and exploited. Castilla elastica yielded caucho negro, or black rubber, and was sourced from tall trees that had to be cut down to harvest. The extraction method for rubber from this tree was often wasteful, involving deep cuts into the trunk, which released all the rubber in one session. (Note: Goodman's information claims that the extraction method used for Castilla trees could yield around two hundred pounds of rubber latex, for just one tree.) The term 'Cauchero' typically refers to the debt peons involved in extracting and exporting caucho rubber. The second type of rubber came from Hevea brasiliensis, producing a product known as jebe or shiringa, which could be tapped long term. The Castilloa tree practically disappeared from the Putumayo region within a span of twenty years. (Note: "After showing us some samples of each, he informed us that the whole region of the Upper Putumayo had once abounded in caucho negro, but that at the present date very little remained, owing to the fierce onslaughts of the caucheros many years ago.")

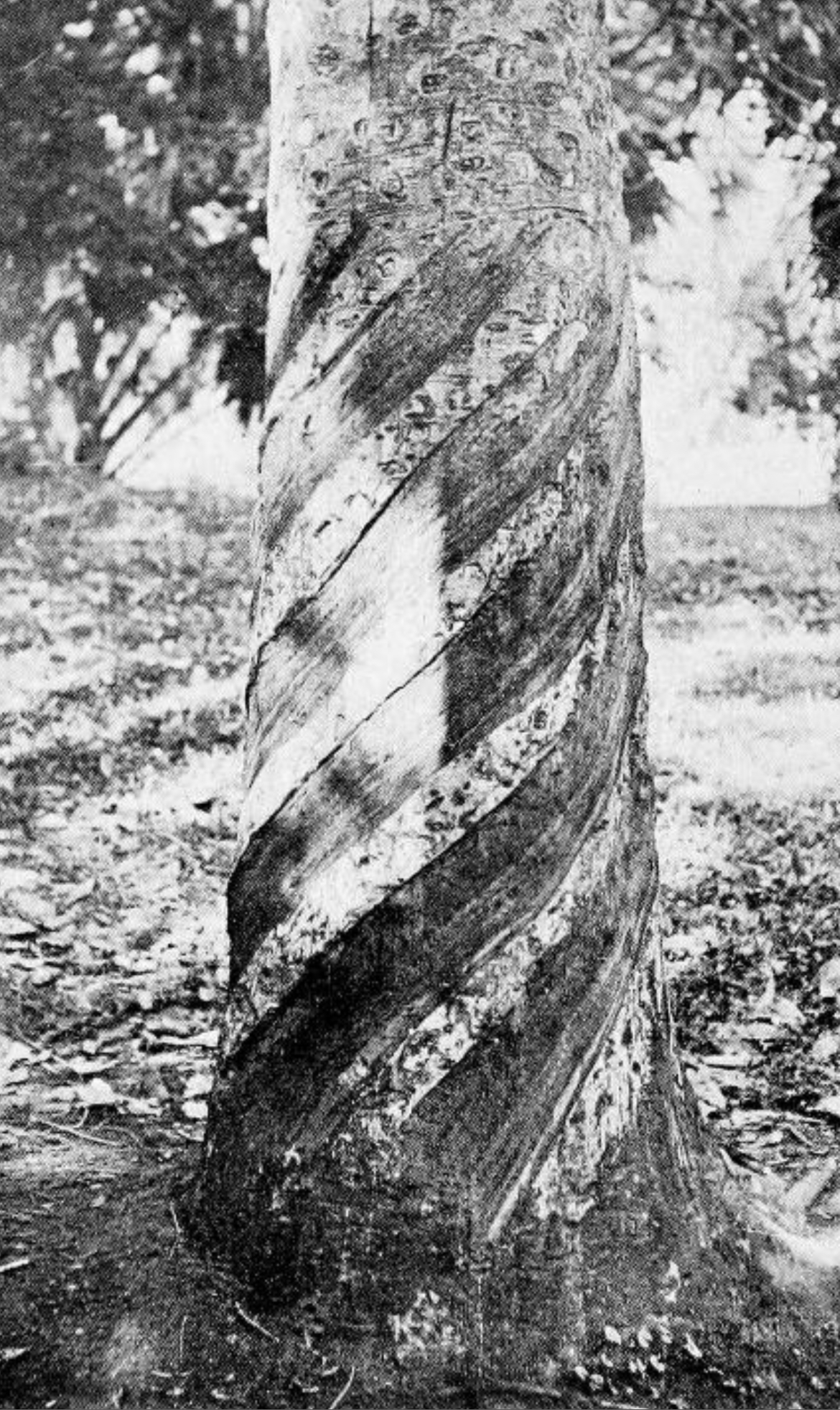
"Spiral tapping of Hevea Brasiliensis" is one of the methods used to harvest rubber from this type of rubber tree

The rubber collected by the Peruvian Amazon Company was extracted by the forced use of indigenous labour. The company used multiple approaches to entrap the natives of the region into gathering rubber for them. Barbadian overseers and the 'muchachos de confianza' watched over the native population and made sure they did not run away. The 'muchachos de confianza' were indigenous males recruited from a young age to act as enforcers for the company. (Note: In the words of Thomas Whiffen, "It is the practice of the rubber-gatherers to train Indian boys and utilise them as escort, and to obtain rubber from the tribes hostile to those to which the boys belong.") The Barbadians and their native counterpart often acted as the executioners of the plantation managers, and were used to terrorise the workforce into compliance.

These Indians were not station hands or laborers engaged by the company: they were forest Indian, members of the various tribes dwelling in the districts. They are not asked if they want to work rubber; they are forced to do it, just like slaves. If they do not bring in rubber they are flogged, or put in chains, or in the 'cepo' or stocks.

— Roger Casement, Slavery in Peru

A stock device known as the cepo was also used to punish the natives who did not meet quota. The device was used laying a victim on their backs and spreading their legs apart before restraining them by interring the legs in holes that were cut into the cepo, sometimes the face of the victim was pointed to the ground. According to Roger Casement, the victims would stay in this device for "hours, sometimes for days, often weeks, and sometimes for months in this painful confinement".

Managers at Matanzas, Abisinia, La Sabana, and other plantations demanded five arrobas of rubber every three months. One arroba was equal to 15 kilos or 30 pounds. At times, this was an unobtainable quota. Conditions in the Putumayo region allowed for two to three fabricos a year. A fabrico represented a harvesting period, usually consisting of 75 days. A fabrico was further divided into five periods referred to as puestas, occurring every 10–15 days when the Natives delivered the rubber to a nearby company station. At the end of the fabrico, all five puestas are carried and transported from the station to either the La Chorrera or El Encanto headquarters, where the rubber then shipped to Iquitos.

=== Hooking by debts ===
The company practised the enganche por deudas system, or "hooking by debts". Enganche entailed getting a person that is working for a company in debt, and keeping them in a perpetual state of indebtedness. In this way, the employee or local indigenous people become dependent on the company and is unable to leave the region until they can pay off this debt.

The procedure was for "commissions" or patrols of whites (armed with the Company's rifles) to go out and collect Indians by force, shooting those who ran away, while the rest, in the words of one of the Company's documents, were "reduced to obedience." When so "conquered" or "reduced" they were set to collect the wild rubber of the forest... Advances ("pagos") of European goods were made to them, and they were then regarded as debtors to the Company, and forced under pain of merciless flogging to work off these debts in rubber... These debts were a transferable and saleable asset, and with the debts was transferable also the right to work the Indians. If they ran away, they were hunted down by bodies of armed men and brought back; and it appears that Peruvian law would sanction the handing over of such debtors to their employers. Any tampering with Indians thus regarded as debtors to an employer was a grave offence on the Putumayo, it was the cause of frequent quarrel between Colombian and Peruvian squatters, who each accused the other of carrying off or attracting away "their Indians" from their legitimate masters.

— Report of the Select Committee On Putumayo, Parliamentary Papers, Volume 14, 1913

The system of debt bondage affected not only the indigenous work force but also the company employees. Even a few of the station chiefs like Abelardo Agüero were in debt to the company. Many of the Barbadian employees were in debt to the company and under a contract that would not allow them to leave the region until the debt was paid. In Roger Casement's own words, "There is little doubt the men have been robbed." (Note: Also in Casement's words, "The rich men who rob the country and the Indians get their goods cheap - the poor man, who is beaten and starved and put in cepo, gets all his pay, and more than his pay, taken back for the necessaries of life.") Some of the Barbadian men were swindled out of a portion of their pay. Their contract stipulated that they would receive the equivalent of £5 a month, and at the time £1 equalled 10 Peruvian soles and 50 cents. However, they were only paid 10 Peruvian soles per pound and not the remaining 50 cents per pound.

Multiple depositions given to Walter Ernest Hardenburg and Roger Casement stated that the company violated many of the promises on their contract. Food, medicine, and other important items that could be found in a store were sold by the company at extortionate rates. (Note: Between January 1909 and March of that year, Barbadian Allan Davis spent a total of 120.60 Peruvian Soles, with 80.20 of those soles spent on food. The manager Juan A. Tizon agreed with Casement that the prices for food were excessive.) Roger Casement believed that some of these goods were sold at over 1,000 per cent of their worth. Originally, the company stipulated it would provide these necessities; however, employees found this was often not the case. The contract also stated that the company would provide a free trip home. However, any debts owed to the company would have to be paid off first, and even then, it was possible for an administrator of the company to withhold this trip home. The debts owed by the Putumayo's indigenous people to the J.C. Arana y Hermanos firm was acquired by the Peruvian Amazon Company upon its formation and these debts were treated as an asset to the new company.

Unrestricted gambling, which the company allowed, was also another factor that affected debts. In place of physical currency, informal documents were written up which promised to pay a gambling debt at a later date. The company advanced credit to the employee who was owed the money from gambling and transferred the debt onto the company books. Most of the employees in the region, including the Barbadians and "muchachos de confianzas," had "wives," and some of them also had children. These dependents were a significant factor in the debts owed to the Peruvian Amazon Company.

== Reports of abuse ==
=== Robuchon and Whiffen ===
In July 1903, Eugène Robuchon met Julio Cesar Arana in Iquitos, who hired Robuchon to map out his rubber territories in the Putumayo. Eugène was a French professional explorer who travelled to South America with the hopes of producing ethnographic, zoological, and botanical documents, including photographs. In a letter to his father, Eugène wrote that Arana had "shown great kindness" to him and his family. During his time mapping the territory, Robuchon collected a number of artefacts and took many photographs.

In August 1905, Robuchon sent his wife and family back to France while he continued his work. Around 14 November, Robuchon descended on a long overland journey to the Caqueta river. From there, he planned to take a canoe to another tributary. It was on this part of the journey, near El Retiro, that Eugène Robuchon disappeared; he had recently turned thirty-three years old. It took thirty-seven days before a search party reached Eugène's last known location, however, the explorer was nowhere to be found.

Rumors emerged that Robuchon was murdered and disappeared because he had witnessed and photographed atrocities within the Putumayo. (Note: "As he is known to have taken several photographs of the horrible crimes committed there, it is thought by many that he was victimised by the employees of Arana. Considering the character of these miserable criminals and certain other peculiar circumstances that are said to have taken place, it would not be strange if such were really the case.") Representatives of the Peruvian Amazon Company claimed he was killed by the local natives and possibly eaten. The two native guides who were apparently with Eugène also disappeared and were not heard from again. Robuchon's notes and manuscript appeared in 1907 under the name En el Putumayo y sus afluentes, edited and published by Carlos Rey de Castro, a friend of Julio C. Arana. Rey de Castro's editing process aimed to portray the newly founded company as a "civilizing force". Several paragraphs were removed from the Spanish copy of the book that would be used as the Peruvian Amazon Company's prospectus.

One paragraph removed from Robuchon's original manuscript referred to the natives' feelings regarding their exploitation. "The Indians care nothing for the preservation of their rubber trees, and rather desire their destruction ... they think that the whites who have come into their dominions in quest of this valuable plant will go away when it has disappeared ... With this idea, they regard with favor the disappearance of the rubber trees, which have been the cause of their reduction to slavery."

Some of the photographs Robuchon took circulated around in Iquitos, generating rumours. Eventually, the photographs would be used in a newspaper as evidence of crime in the Putumayo. These images provided visual testimony to the abuses and atrocities occurring during the Putumayo genocide.

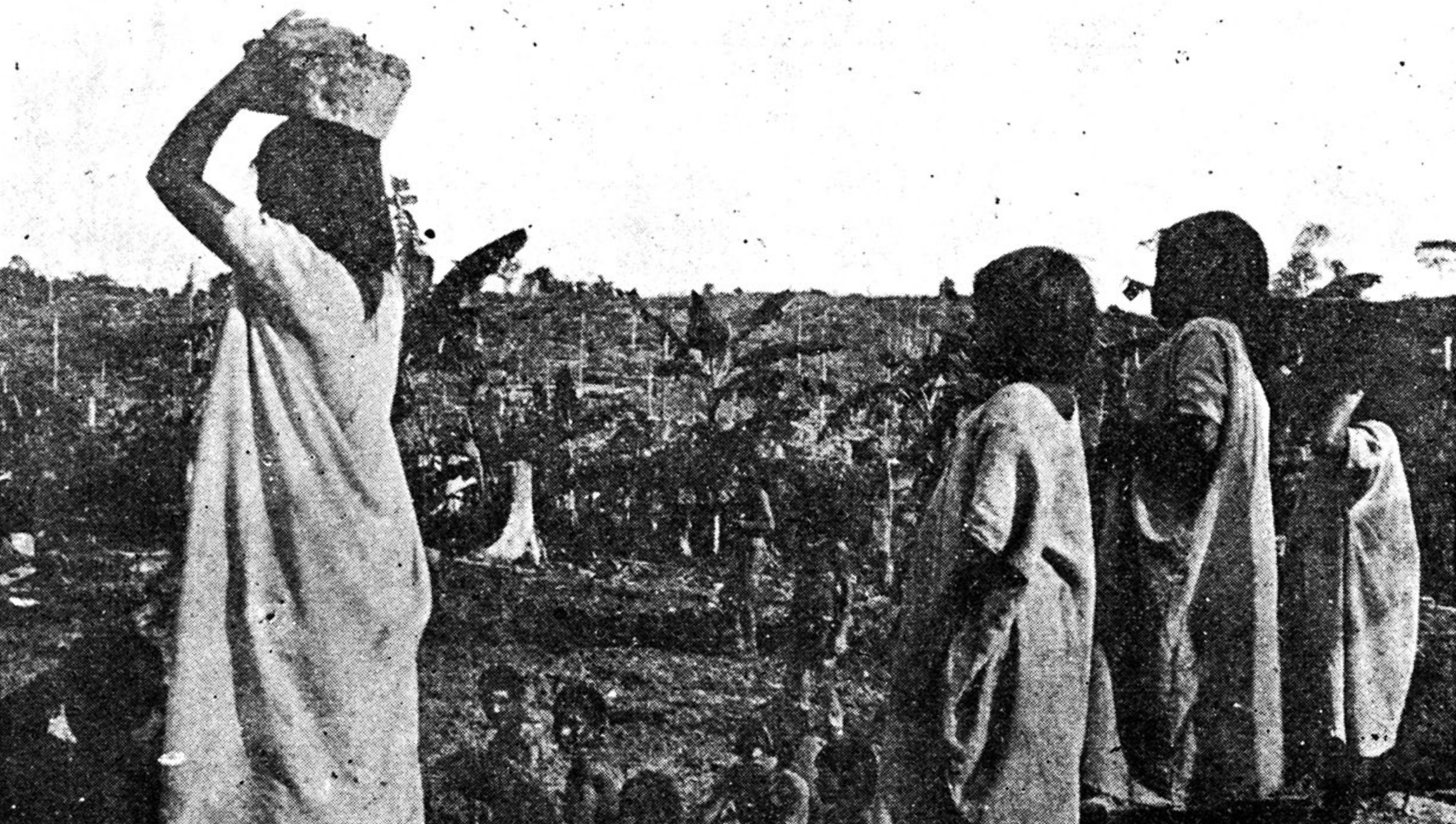
Carrying materials for construction at La Chorrera. Photograph taken by Eugène Robuchon.

Captain Thomas William Whiffen ventured to the Putumayo region in April 1908, with one of the main intentions of his trip being to solve the disappearance of Robuchon. Whiffen was a British military officer who had been wounded during the Boer War. This injury allowed Whiffen to travel to the Putumayo while still in service. Near the end of October 1908, Whiffen and his expedition found the remains of a deserted shelter, which John Brown confirmed as Robuchon's last camp. John Brown originally accompanied Robuchon on his trip as well but left Eugène to find help for the French explorer. Eight "broken photograph plates" were unearthed along with an eyepiece of a sextant. A wrecked raft was also found that Brown confirmed to be Robuchon's, but the raft had no clues. Whiffen and his group returned to La Chorrera on 22 February 1909, with the disappearance of Robuchon still unsolved. Whiffen concluded that Eugène probably died in March or April 1906.

Whiffen was tracked down by the British Foreign Office in 1909, who requested the captain to send a report of his experiences. Thomas Whiffen explained that he had passed through the Putumayo region twice in the previous year. The first time, the company knew about his movements in advance, and Whiffen believed that the company removed any evidence of abuses. He thought "prisoners were liberated, floggings ceased, and outwardly affairs assumed a peaceful and humane aspect." On the second journey through the region, he discovered "Hidden in the forest beyond the houses, stocks and whipping posts." In the same report, Whiffen included a first-hand account from John Brown. In one incident, Brown relayed when two plantation managers had a tribal chief in custody at Morelia. The managers had a shooting competition, where they tried to shoot the chief's genitals. Afterwards, the native was "despatched according to the ordinary method". Referring to the rubber collecting system in the region, Whiffen stated it was "absolutely that of forced labor with its necessary and attendant evils".

Whiffen also provided some information about the political situation in the region. He believed that the company was in control of the region, with "no effective administration or occupation by the Peruvian Government". (Note: Roger Casement provided additional context as well. "The region was practically a no-man's land, lying remote from any restraining authority or civilizing influence, and figuring on maps of South America as claimed by three separate republics.") Whiffen also stated his belief that the commissario of the Central Government at Lima, as well as the few Peruvian soldiers in the region were "secretly the paid servants of the company". Another revelation provided in his report was that many of the atrocities were committed by natives, against the natives under the command of company employees. According to Whiffen, the company 'took on' and armed native youths of a tribe, who would then be used against another rival tribe, "thus putting them perhaps at the mercy of their hereditary enemies". These young natives who were forced to act as the enforcers of the company were at risk of losing their own lives if they were not obedient and did not carry out instructions. Whiffen was later accused by the company of blackmail.

=== Saldaña ===
Before he founded his newspaper publications, at the age of 43, Benjamin Saldaña Rocca petitioned a judge to proceed with criminal charges against 18 employees of J.C. Arana y Hermanos. The petition contained excerpts and details of the horrible acts of violence committed against the natives who collect rubber for the company. Saldaña urged the judge "as the bones of thousands of Indians who have been murdered lie scattered round the houses of the sections such as Matanzas, Ultimo Retiro, La Sabana, Santa Catalina, San Victor and all the other dependencies of El Encanto and La Chorrera. ... a visit of inspection [should] be undertaken as soon as possible, before the bones of the victims can be made to disappear." Saldaña Rocca only received silence from the courts. (Note: The court eventually issued a statement declaring that it was too incompetent to act on the situation.) Two weeks later, on 22 August 1907, he published the first issue of his newspaper La Sancion publicly attacking Arana.

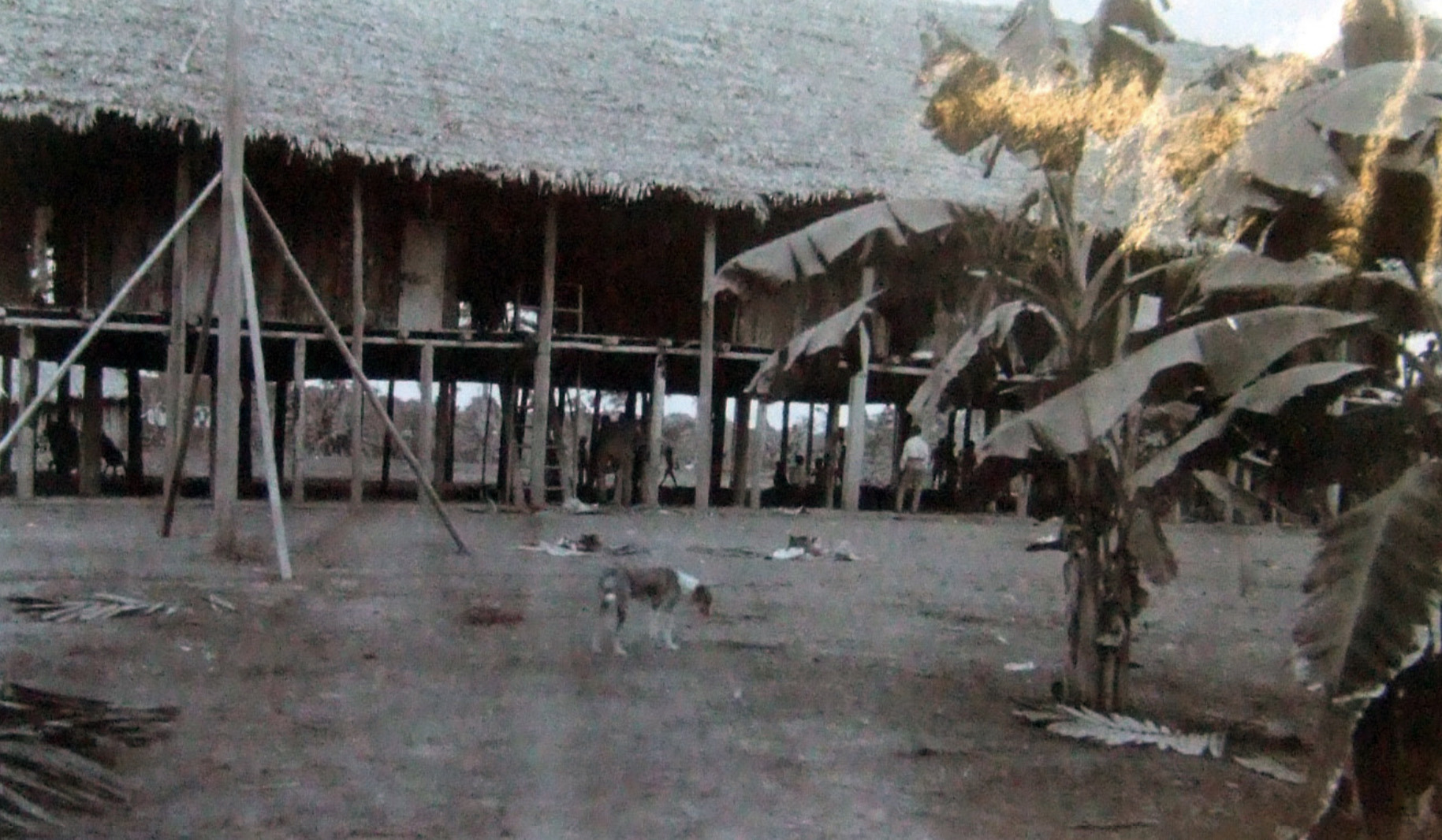
Matanzas rubber station, Putumayo

The paper had a variety of articles, covering local news, court reports, port movements, and in nearly every issue of the paper Saldaña published new revelations about Julio César Arana. He published the contents of the petition the courts ignored: and to corroborate, from the very beginning Saldaña included eyewitness accounts. These were firsthand accounts coming from ex-employees of Arana's company, detailing the coercive and abusive system: describing the torture, maiming, and killing of the enslaved natives. In the first issue of La Sancion, Saldaña included a letter and firsthand account from Julio Muriedas, detailing crimes at La Chorrera: and crimes committed at Matanzas by the manager Armando Normand. Muriedas relayed that Normand applies 200 lashes or more when the enslaved natives don't arrive with the correct weight of rubber. (Note: The Barbadian Westerman Leavine corroborated this information with the deposition he provided to Roger Casement.) When the natives flee, Normand suspends them by their hands and feet before applying fire. This torture is induced so that the children will tell where their fathers are hiding.

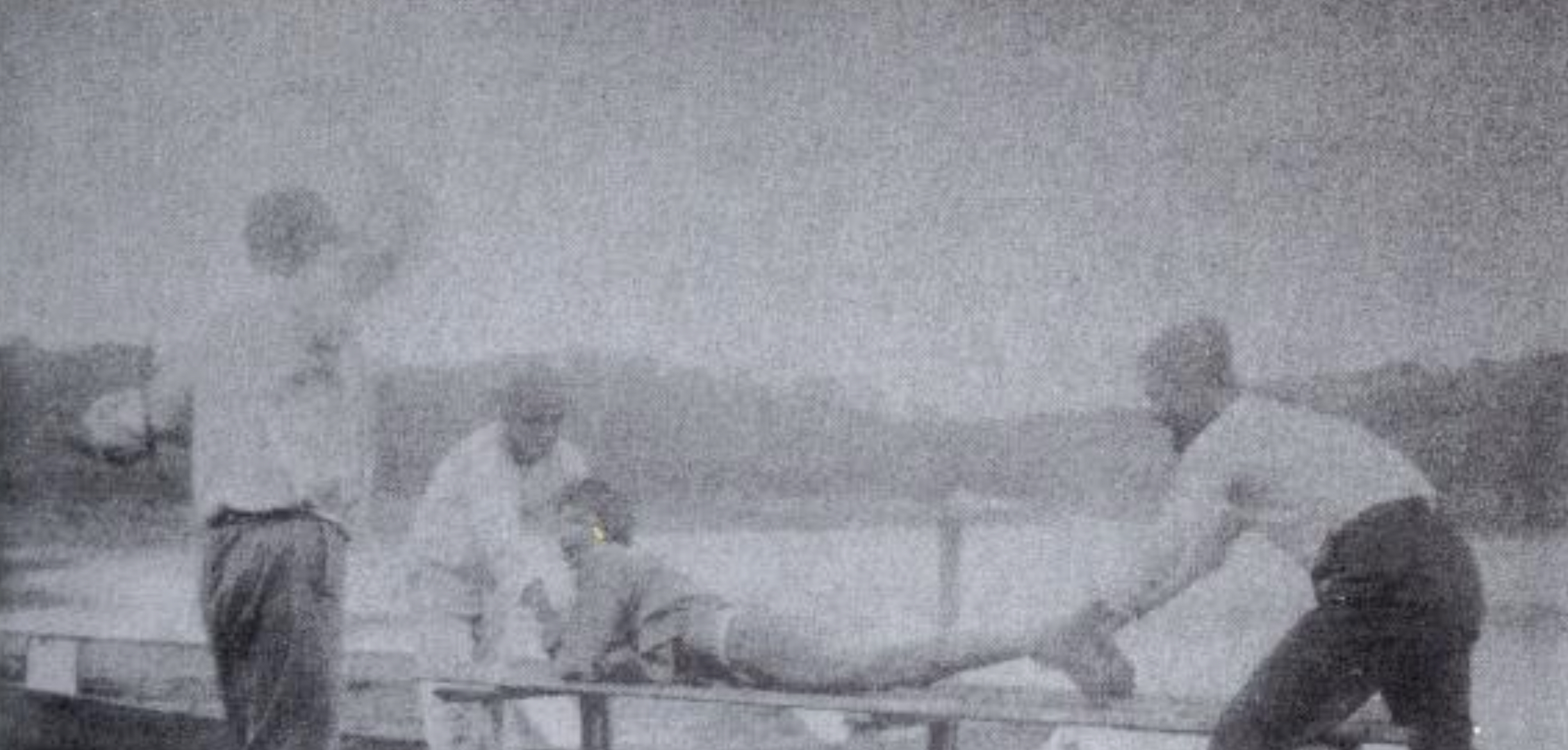
Flogging of a Putumayo native, carried out by the employees of Julio César Arana. Photograph taken by Eugène Robuchon.

La Sancion was intended to run twice a week but soon became a daily publication. By that time, Saldaña Rocca founded a second publication named La Felpa, which was four pages long and contained a political cartoon to make its point. The very first issue of La Felpa contained four different pictures titled "The Crimes of the Putumayo: Flagellations, Mutilations, Tortures, and Target Practice," to describe how the natives were being treated. The last issue of Saldaña Rocca's newspaper came out on 22 February 1908, just three weeks after Hardenburg arrived in Iquitos. The local authorities at Iquitos raided Saldaña's printing store and destroyed some of the equipment before escorting Saldaña out of the city.

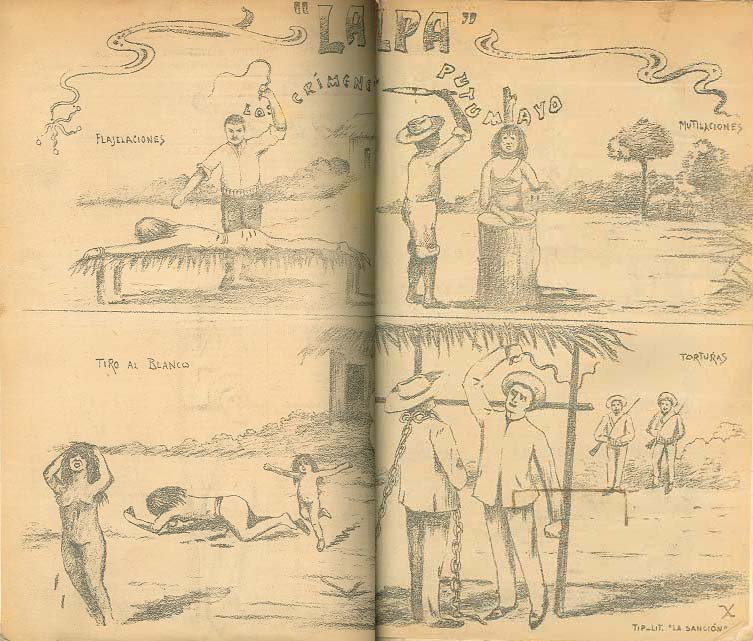
Illustration on the first issue of La Felpa

=== Hardenburg ===
Walter Ernest Hardenburg and Walter Perkins were two American engineers who journeyed to the Putumayo region between 1907 and 1908. They previously worked on the Colombian Pacific Railroad, and were on their way to Bolivia to work on the Madeira-Mamoré Railroad which was designed to connect northern Bolivia to Brazil. They decided to cross the Andes and descend into Amazonia as part of their journey. They met Colombian General Pablo Monroy, stationed in Pasto, who had information about the Putumayo river. He warned them it was dangerous, informing them that Colombia and Peru had recently entered a modus vivendi to pull back garrisons and military authorities from the region. (Note: This document was signed on 6 July 1906.) The General believed that the Peruvians were not adhering to the agreement. Monroy also told them that they could travel on a launch from El Encanto, 500 miles down river, to Iquitos. From there he could continue on his journey as well as save weeks of effort.

They loaded up on supplies and travelled 150 miles over rough terrain before reaching a navigable point in the Putumayo river. On 22 December 1907, they met Jesús López, a Colombian rubber tapper who provided further insight into the political situation. He informed the pair that the Peruvians were harassing and violently expelling Colombian settlers. He added that these actions were being carried out by the Peruvian military, under the command of the Peruvian Amazon Rubber Company. López believed that the company's goal was to acquire all Colombian concessions by any means necessary.

Years ago, there were dozens of Colombian rubber stations along the Putumayo, but by the time of Hardenburg's journey, only three remained. The rest had been absorbed or taken by force. López warned them not to take the boat from El Encanto and instead aim for Remolino, a Colombian settlement five days further down the river. From Remolino, they proceeded to another Colombian settlement named La Reserva. David Serrano owned La Reserva and agreed to help Walter sell his boat and buy anything he was willing to sell. (Note: The owners of Remolino, along with Serrano also managed a portage route between Josa and the Napo River, which lead to Iquitos. The restriction of portage routes to the Napo River by the Peruvian Amazon Company would further isolate the indigenous population.) While waiting for Perkins to arrive, Serrano told Walter about his experience with the Peruvian Amazon Company. A month earlier, employees of the company showed up at his establishment. He owed money to the branch manager at El Encanto, Miguel S. Loayza, who used the debt as an excuse to send a 'commission' to rob Serrano. They chained David to a tree and raped his wife in front of him. After the employees ransacked the house and stole his rubber, they returned to the boat carrying away his wife as well as their small son. David later learned that his wife was forced to become a concubine to Miguel Loayza while their son was used as a personal servant for Miguel.

The abuse against Serrano caught the attention of the Colombian government, which sent a police inspector named Jesús Orjuela to investigate. Hardenburg decided to go with Orjuela to El Dorado, where Loayza was invited to take part in a diplomatic conference. El Dorado was the last Colombian rubber station downriver.

On 12 January, a Peruvian gunboat named the Iquitos and the Liberal steamship docked at La Reserva with an unknown number of Peruvian soldiers. The Liberal was a Peruvian Amazon Company steamship. The party was looking for David Serrano, who fled into the forest. They looted the place, taking away goods from the storehouse and almost two thousand kilos of rubber. La Reserva was the second stop on this excursion: previously, the soldiers attacked La Unión and massacred the Colombians there. La Reserva was burned to the ground and all the rubber brought aboard the ships.

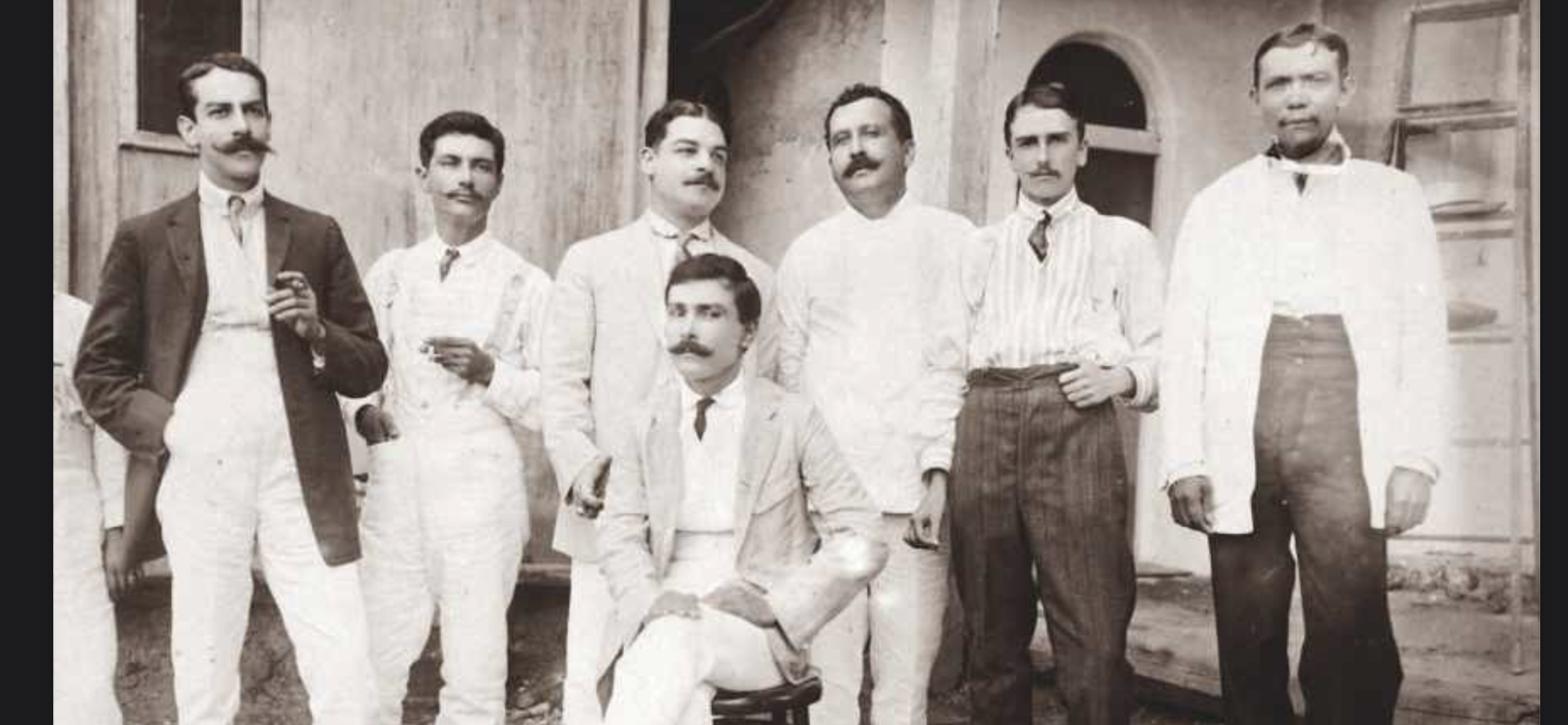
The administrators of El Encanto, with their boss Miguel S. Loayza (seated)

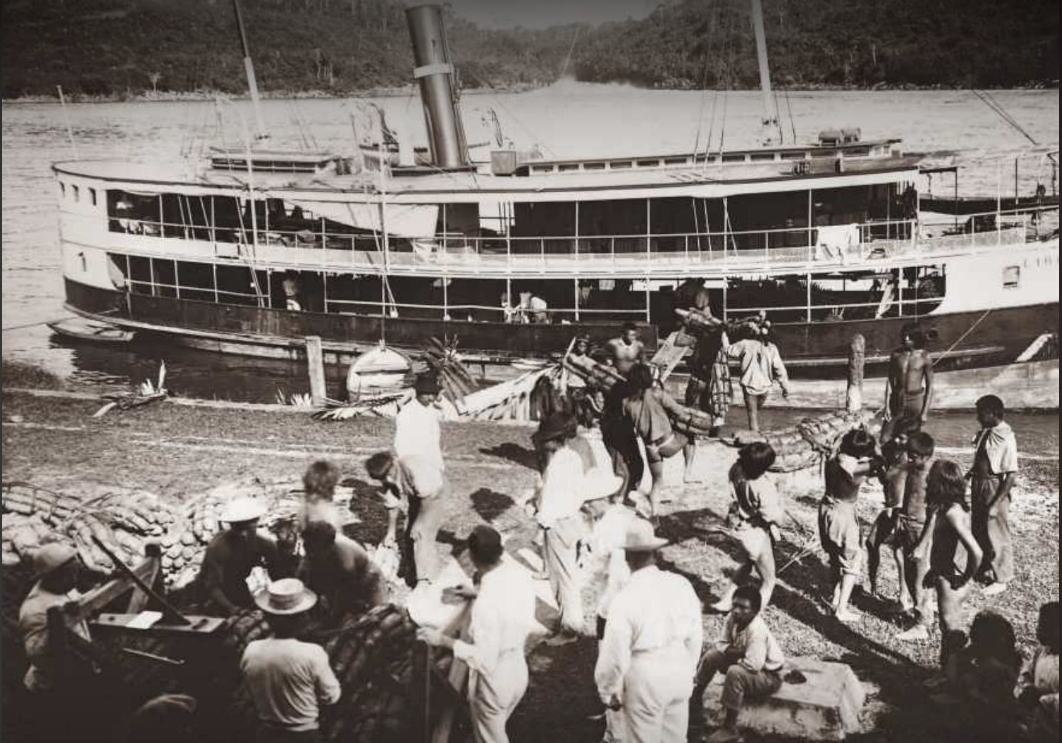
The Liberal steamship, owned by the Peruvian Amazon Company. In W. E. Hardenburg's book, he mentions that natives are frequently brought aboard the company's steamships to be sold as slaves in Iquitos.

The two boats travelled downriver to El Encanto, and on the same day, 12 January, they intercepted the boat Orjuela and Hardenburg were on. The two had made several attempts to contact Miguel Loayza who never showed up to the meeting in El Dorado. Orjuela and Hardenburg were thrown onto the "Liberal" as captives, where Hardenburg was surprised to be reunited with Perkins. The ship continued on towards El Dorado, which they also destroyed. Upon arrival at El Encanto, Hardenburg protested his arrest, before being informed he would be allowed to leave to Iquitos when the "Liberal" was ready to sail. Due to their treatment, Hardenburg believed they were going to be murdered by the Peruvians. For their safety, Hardenburg and Perkins lied, stating that they worked for a large American company, so hurting them would have diplomatic consequences. Later, Hardenburg was sent on to Iquitos without Perkins and there he spent three months with no news about his companion. They were reunited on 22 April, with Perkins still wearing the same clothes he had on from their last encounter.

Perkins recounted that he was held as a house prisoner by Loayza, who coerced him into signing a document stating he was being well treated. He also disclosed that the Peruvians later caught up with David Serrano when they returned to La Reserva again and torched the buildings. The soldiers bound the hands of David Serrano and 28 other men behind their backs before shooting them to death. "They not only shot them to death, but horribly mutilated their bodies with their machetes and threw them into the river."

One day, four months into Hardenburg's stay in Iquitos, he was approached by Miguel Galvez, whom he had never seen before. Galvez revealed that he was the son of Benjamin Saldaña Rocca, a courageous newspaper owner who had recently fled from Iquitos and was now working in Lima. Before departing the city, Saldaña had gathered all of his documents, which he entrusted to the mother of his son. At his father's urging, Miguel Galvez delivered them to Walter Hardenburg, believing that Hardenburg would continue to challenge Arana's actions.

Hardenburg began gathering corroborating evidence to accompany the package of documents from Saldaña. He corresponded by letter, investigating the operations of the Peruvian Amazon Company. Hardenburg collected twenty testimonials from various individuals, all of whom swore to their authenticity before a notary in Iquitos. Recognizing the danger of remaining in Iquitos, he departed the city in 1909, carrying with him his book manuscript, the testimonials, and Saldaña Rocca's documents. Hardenburg travelled by boat from the Booth Steamship Company to Pará and eventually reached Liverpool. Despite their intentions, Hardenburg and Perkins never reached their original destination in Bolivia to work on the Madeira-Mamoré Railway.

On 22 September 1909, a small London-based watchdog magazine named Truth ran an article with the headline "The Devil's Paradise": A British-owned Congo," which detailed Hardenburg's experiences and the atrocities perpetrated in the Putumayo. The article sparked public outrage in England, revealing that a British-based company was profiting from a slave trade and appeared to be responsible for atrocities. In response to Hardenburg's allegations, the Peruvian Amazon Company ordered a five-man commission to investigate the region's "commercial prospects." The British Foreign Office seized this opportunity to send their own representative on the commission, selecting Roger Casement, who served as Consul-General for Britain in Brazil. Casement had previously investigated atrocities in the Congo Free State, where rubber was also harvested by forced labour.

Years later, in 1912, Hardenburg released his book The Putumayo, the Devil's Paradise. He drew from his own personal experience in the Putumayo and other firsthand accounts to shed light on the company's operations. Among other atrocities, Hardenburg revealed that with every ship that left the Putumayo with rubber, five to fifteen native boys and girls were also transported to Iquitos. There, in the capital of the Department of Loreto. (Note: In 1910, the captain of the Liberal, Reigada, admitted to Roger Casement that there were "plenty of Huitoto women and boys who have been sold in Iquitos" and that "Men were known to give £40 for a boy or girl".) Hardenburg concluded his book with the following statement: "to relate all the crimes and infamies committed in this tragic region by this company and its employees in its almost incredible persecution and exploitation of the Indians, would prove an interminable task, so many are the crimes committed in this devil's paradise."

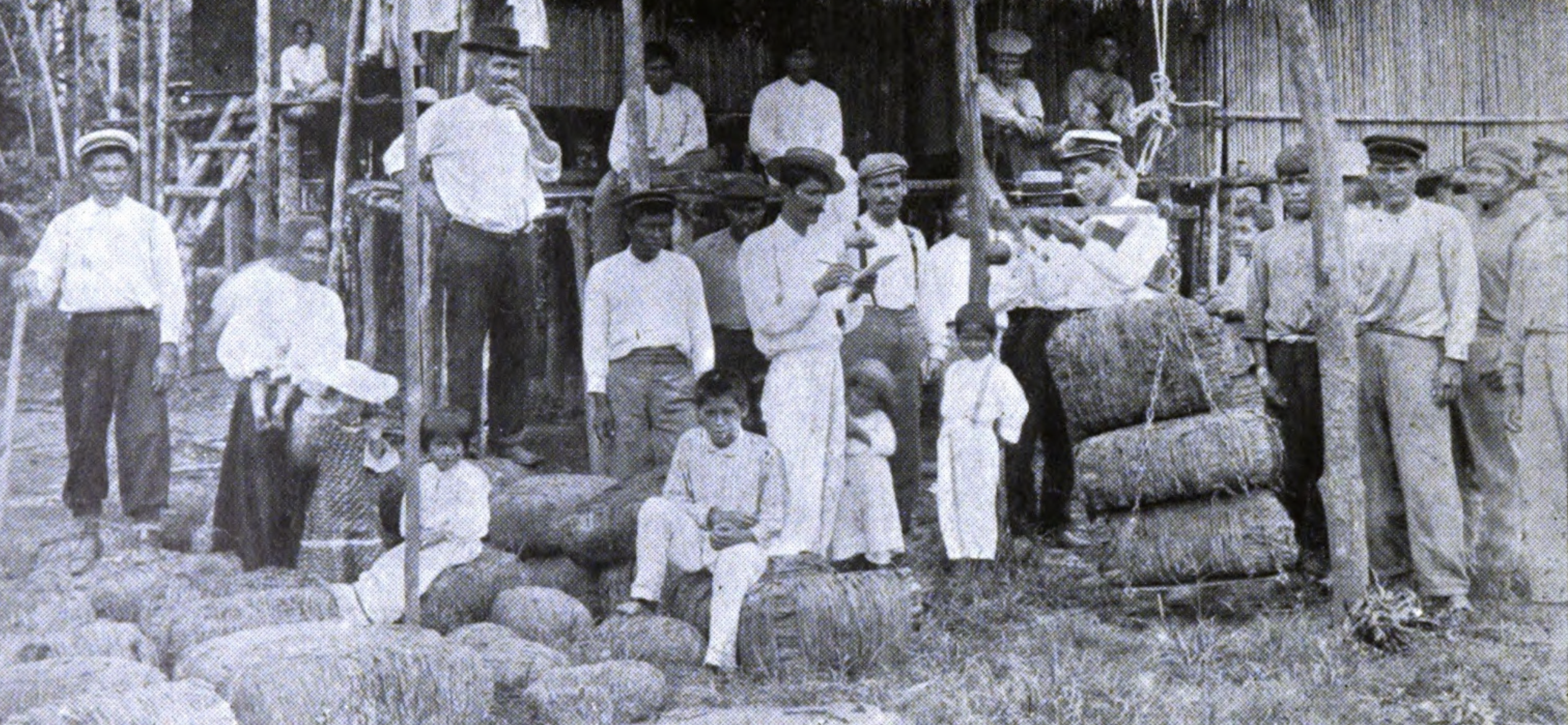
Weighing the rubber at a company plantation

Among other cruelties, Hardenburg, Saldaña, and the ex-employees of the company, implicated the company with crimes such as: kidnapping and engaging in slave trade, forced concubinage, the murder of native men, women, and children, as well as Colombians, burning people alive, dismemberment, torture, cruel and unusual punishments, starving the natives to death, as well as other illegal acts.

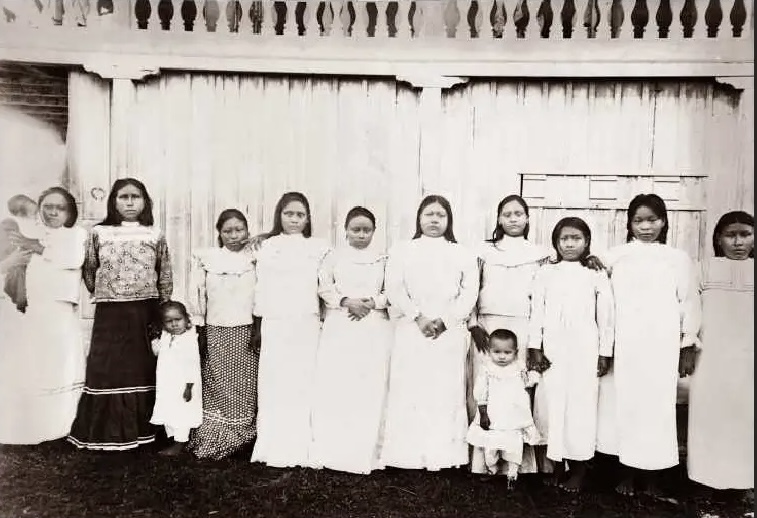
Photograph of concubines belonging to the Peruvian Amazon Company at La Chorrera, 1912

Hardenburg compared the company's actions to the Congo atrocities, mentioning a similar system of terror. Outlining the actions of the Peruvian Amazon Company in the Putumayo, he states:

I am in possession of definite documentary evidence which, I think, justifies me in making the following statements as to the results of this system:—

1. The pacific Indians of the Putumayo are forced to work day and night at the extraction of rubber, without the slightest remuneration except the food necessary to keep them alive.

2. They are kept in the most complete nakedness, many of them not even possessing the biblical fig-leaf.

3. They are robbed of their crops, their women, and their children to satisfy the voracity, lasciviousness, and avarice of this company and its employees, who live on their food and violate their women.

4. They are sold wholesale and retail in Iquitos, at prices that range from £20 to £40 each.

5. They are flogged inhumanly until their bones are laid bare, and great raw sores cover them.

6. They are given no medical treatment, but are left to die, eaten by maggots, when they serve as food for the chiefs' dogs.

7. They are castrated and mutilated, and their ears, fingers, arms, and legs are cut off.

8. They are tortured by means of fire and water, and by tying them up, crucified head down.

9. Their houses and crops are burned and destroyed wantonly and for amusement.

10. They are cut to pieces and dismembered with knives, axes, and machetes.

11. Their children are grasped by the feet and their heads are dashed against trees and walls until their brains fly out.

12. Their old folk are killed when they are no longer able to work for the company.

13. Men, women, and children are shot to provide amusement for the employees or to celebrate the sábado de gloria, or, in preference to this, they are burned with kerosene so that the employees may enjoy their desperate agony.

— Walter E. Hardenburg, The Putumayo, The Devil's Paradise, 1912

== Casement Report ==
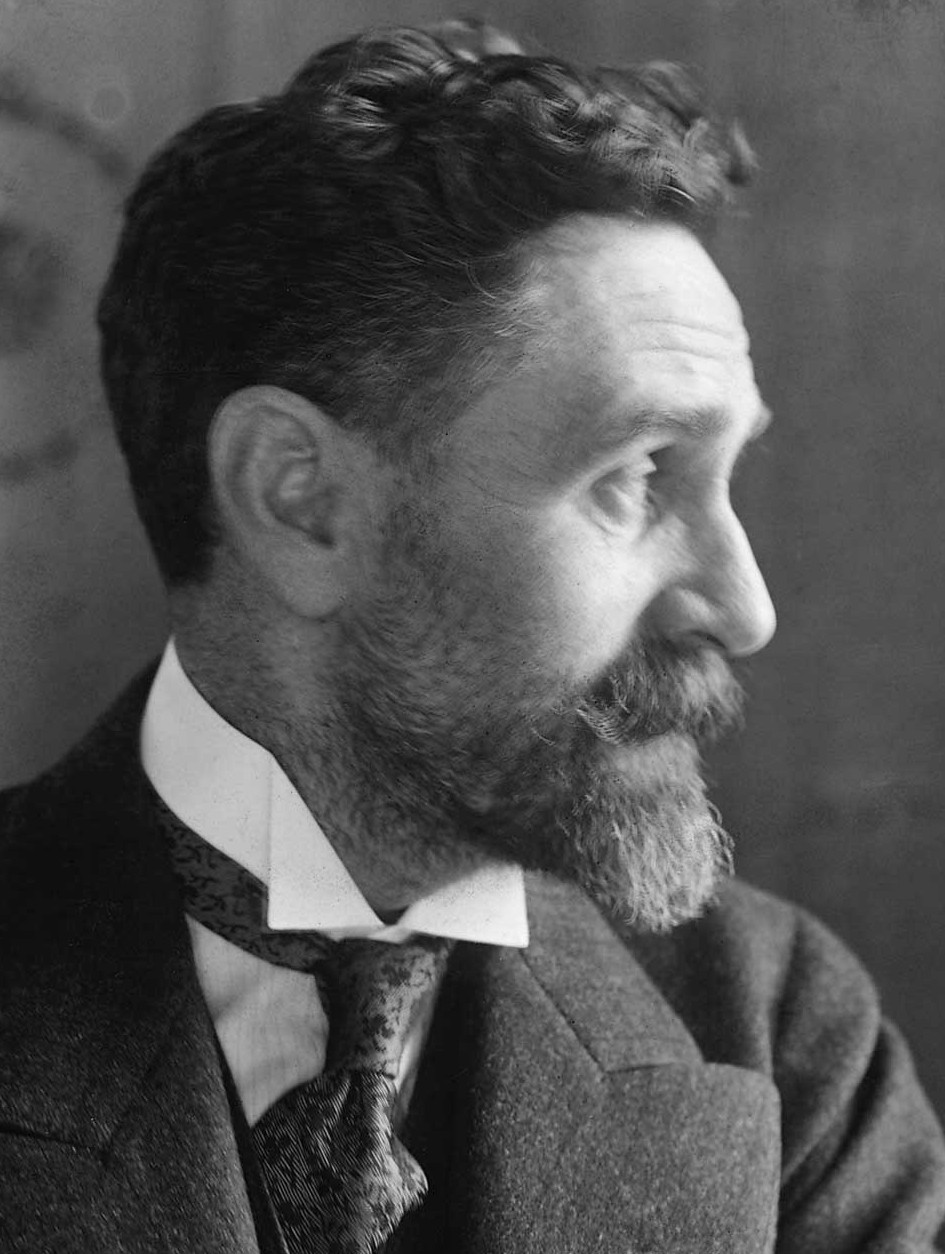
Roger Casement

The company participated in abuses and criminal actions against labourers in the area, with its Peruvian overseers using force and even killing to suppress the workers. An investigative report by Roger Casement, British consul, exposed the abuses, embarrassing British members of the company's board. They put pressure on Arana to improve operations. A movement grew to stop the abuse and eventually led to the end of the company. The Anti-Slavery and Aborigines Protection Society was one of the activist groups working to stop the abuses.

In response to the revelations published in Hardenburg's scathing article, the British government in 1910 sent the consul-general Roger Casement to investigate. His report also denounced the operations of the PAC. A 1912 book by Hardenburg, which contained edited extracts of Casement's report, was described by its editor as "perhaps the most terrible page in the whole history of commercialism".

A few years earlier, Casement exposed the Congo Free State and the genocide in the Congo in an investigative report. That ordeal gave him first-hand experience with the rubber industry. In describing the atrocities of the Putumayo, Casement used a variety of terms to convey the terror. Some include: "syndicate of crime", "reign of terror", "piracy and terrorization", "not merely slavery but extermination", and "a crime against humanity".

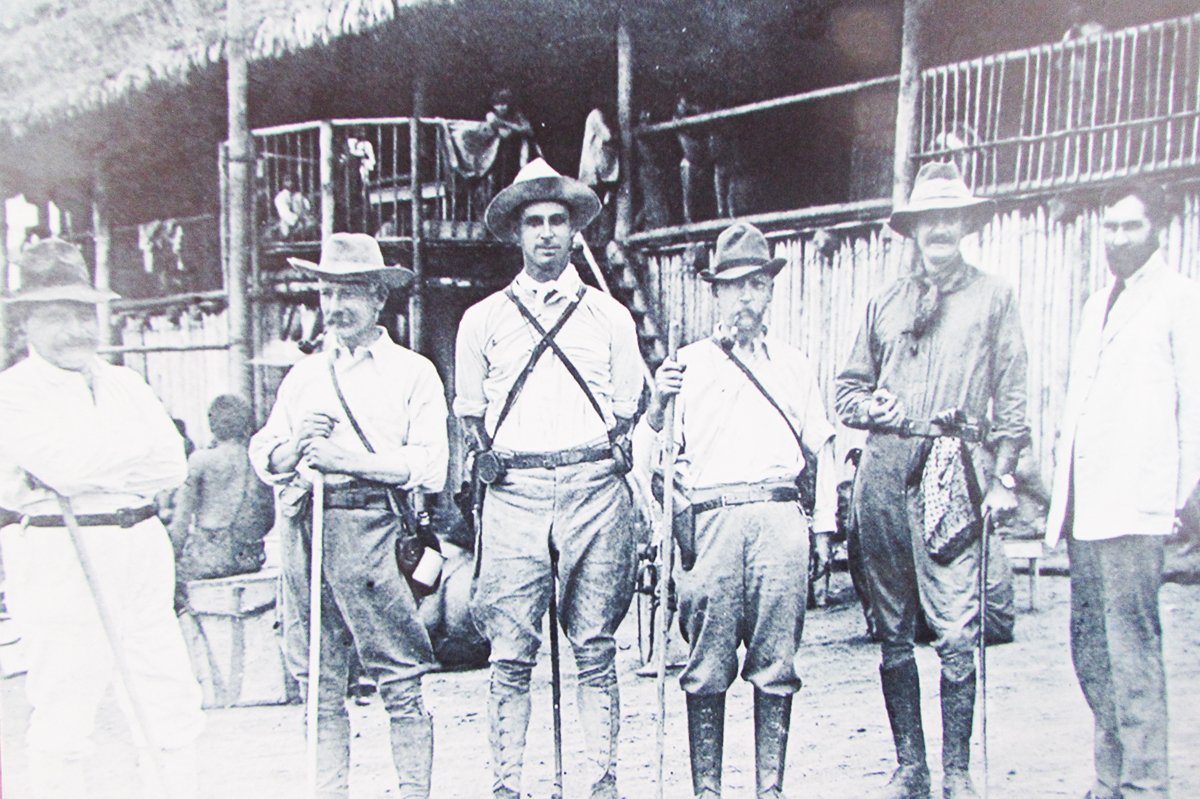
Casement and the 1910 Commissioners: (From left to right) Juan A. Tizon, Seymour Bell, H. L. Gielgud, Walter Fox, Louis Barnes, and Roger Casement

Casement arrived at La Chorrera in September 1910 to interview the Barbadian men still employed by the Peruvian Amazon Company. For the safety of the Barbadians, Casement arranged to buy out their remaining debt and send them to Brazil. It was believed that if they returned to Iquitos, they would either disappear or be blamed by Peruvian officials and the company for the Putumayo genocide. On 21 November, the Liberal dropped off fifteen Barbadian men at a small port in Brazil, freeing them from the Putumayo. Their first-hand accounts were instrumental to Casement's report and exposing the company.

Casement's report focused on the English subjects employed by the company: the Barbadians. Between 1904 and 1905, the company hired around 200 men from the island of Barbados on two-year contracts. (Note: There was a total of 257 Barbadians who signed two-year employment contracts with Alarco Arana & Co. in a twelve-month period between 1904-1905. Out of that group, 196 of them worked around the Putumayo basin.) Gambling and 'extortionate prices' extended their contracts, essentially making them peons working for the company. Instead of becoming labourers as promised, they were "acting as armed bullies and terrorists over the surrounding native population". Detailed firsthand accounts implicating both the Barbadians and plantation chiefs were documented by Casement in his report. (Note: Casement's final report included the statements of thirty different men from Barbados.) These included multiple instances of cruelty and murder, often at the orders of the plantation staff.

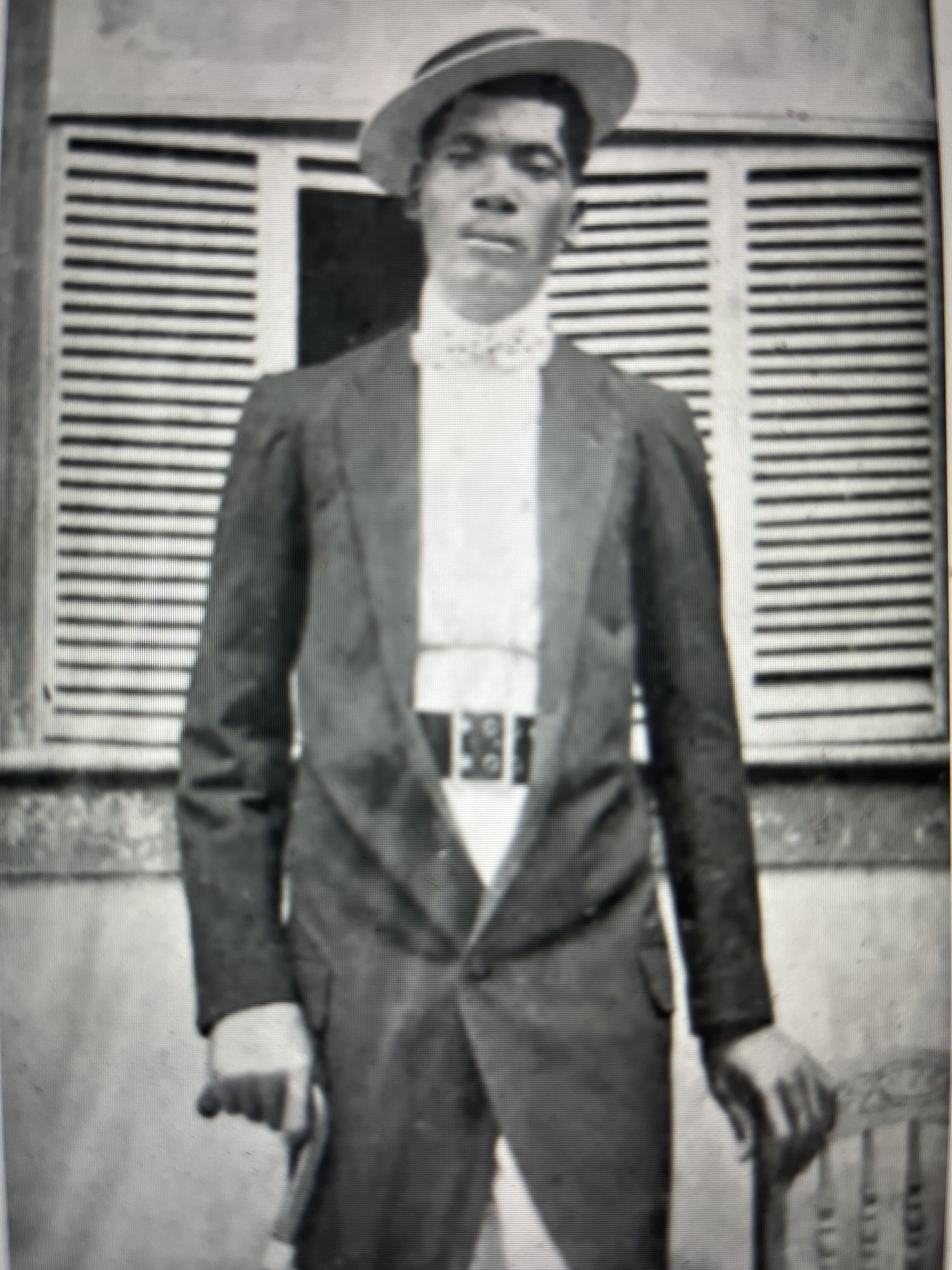
Adolfo Gibbs, employed by the Peruvian Amazon Company in 1904

On 31 January 1911, Casement submitted his first complete report to the British Foreign Office. It described not only the system of extortion and abuse placed upon the Barbadians, but also the condition of the natives. The report emphasised that rubber collecting in the Putumayo was an exploitative operation rather than an industry based on commercial principles. (Note: Casement wrote that "[e]ven in the pages of the official publication of M. Robuchon's diaries, it is made clear that the operations he described were in no sense commercial, but were an armed and forcible exploitation of savages.") That the natives were the main attraction for the exploiters and were the true source of income: not the rubber trees scattered throughout the forest. (Note: Casement wrote in this report: "The true attraction from the first to Colombian or Peruvian caucheros was not so much the presence of the scattered Hevea braziliensis trees throughout this remote forest as the existence of fairly numerous tribes of docile, or at any rate of easily subdued, Indians".)"There were no labourers - there was no industry in the Putumayo. It was simply a wild forest inhabited by wild Indians, who were hunted like wild animals and made to bring in rubber by hook or by crook, and murdered and flogged if they did. That was the system."

The evidence of abuse came not only from the Barbadians' testimony but also from Casement's own eyes. "The marks of the lash were not confined to men or adults. Women, and even little children, were more than once found, their limbs scarred with weals left by the thong of the twist tapir-hide ... the chief implement used for coercing and terrorizing the native population."

On 13 July 1912, the British government published both of Casement's reports in the Putumayo Blue Book, which included dispatches, telegrams, and thirty interviews with Barbadians who worked in the Putumayo. An article appeared in The Times newspaper two days later with the headline "The Putumayo Atrocities: A South American Congo - Sir Roger Casement's Report published". This article gave an introduction to Casement's work in the region, and pointed out that none of the claims were disputed by agents of the Peruvian Amazon Company, who were present at several of the interviews. The article deduced that conditions in the Putumayo had likely worsened since the 1910 investigation, judging from the fact that rubber exports had increased since then. Rather than focusing on the atrocities and abuses in the region, The Times article highlighted the lack of reform to the system and warned Peru of substantial consequences if the country failed to act.

== Judicial investigation ==
In response to the criminal complaint filed by Benjamin Saldaña Rocca on August 9, 1907, the courts of Iquitos issued a writ stating that they were incompetent to act on the issue due to the existence of a modus vivendi between Peru and Colombia. The judicial investigation organized by the government of Peru began its inquiry at La Chorrera on March 27 of 1911, more than three years after Saldaña's initial complaint. The investigation was led by Romulo Paredes and Carlos A. Valcárcel, the latter of which was absent from most of the inquiry held on the Peruvian Amazon Company estate. Parededs questioned members of the Huitoto, Ocaina, Andoque, Muinane, Nonuya, Recigaro, and Bora nations during his investigation and confirmed "the existence of many more crimes than those which had been denounced."

Paredes emphasized that five notable massacres that occurred in the region deserved attention, the two massacres at La Chorrera in 1903, the killing of more than one hundred Boras near the Cahuinari River in 1907 and a raid in 1906 led by Augusto Jimenez that led to multiple decapitations. While those massacres occurred prior to the establishment of the Peruvian Amazon Company, the company employed several of the perpetrators of those crimes: notably Victor Macedo, Miguel S. Loayza, Aurelio Rodriguez and Jimenez. Paredes wrote: "[a]ccording to the evidence taken in the enquiry it would seem that the fire massacre ('hecatombe') in La Chorrera gave rise to these chiefs. The execution of thirty Ocainas Indians, tortured and burned alive, was thus a sort of patent, a diploma for governing sanctions."

Paredes travelled through and investigated all of La Chorrera's important rubber stations, El Encanto was the only station that the judge visited on the Caraparaná River. The centers of Abisinia and Santa Catalina were singled out by Paredes as the "chief centres of the bloody raids against the Boras". Matanzas, the station that most of the Peruvian Amazon Company's enslaved Andoke population was dedicated to, was referred to as "completely annihilated and almost extinguished" due to massacres as well as torturing under the management of Armando Normand.

Paredes, along with Hardenburg and Roger Casement, emphasized that commission payment's issued to managers based on the amount of rubber collected at a specific station was one of the principal causes of crime in the region. Paredes noted that this incentivized the managers, as well as their subordinates, into pressuring the indigenous population to collect as much rubber as possible in as short of a time period as possible.

Crime swelled proportion to the rubber returned, and mounted step by step with the number of kilogrammes of rubber obtained. Thus, the larger the number of murders, the higher the production, which is to say that a large proportion of the rubber was produced out of blood and corpses.

— Rómulo Paredes, Precis of the Report of Dr. Rómulo Paredes, Chapter VIII (Note: This section is titled: "Principal massacres and the places where they were committed: Crime on the Putumayo: causes of its development.")

Paredes's investigation eventually led to the issuing of three sets of arrest warrants, respectively issued on April 7, June 29, and July 29 of 1911. The first set of arrest warrants was levied against 22 perpetrators of the 1903 massacre of Ocaina people at La Chorrera. The first and second set were issued at La Chorrera, the second set was issued after the completion of Paredes investigation and they called for the arrest of 215 individuals employed throughout La Chorrera's agency. The last set of arrest warrants was issued from Iquitos by judge Valcárcel, these were levied against individuals that Paredes did not file proceedings against, notably the Peruvian Amazon Company's general manager Pablo Zumaeta and La Chorrera's manager Victor Macedo. Zumaeta's arrest warrant was dismissed by the court of Iquitos on August 28 of 1911. Valcárcel later issued an arrest warrant against Julio Arana on December 10 of 1912, however the courts of Iquitos also dismissed this warrant.

== Rubber industry ==
Among the findings by the various investigatory parties were widespread debt bondage, slavery, (Note: "The word 'slavery' is used advisedly, for the condition of the Indians is in reality nothing else.") torture, mutilation, and many other crimes in the Amazonian rubber industry, with the Putumayo area being but one example. (Note: "Under the Peruvian republic and the regimen of absentee capitalism today, tribes of useful people of this same land have been defrauded, driven into slavery, ravished, tortured, and destroyed. This has been done, not in single instances at the command of some savage potentate, but in tens of thousands under a republican Government, in a Christianized country, at the behest of the agents of a great joint-stock company with headquarters in London: the "crime" of these unfortunates being that they did not always bring in rubber sufficiently fast—work for which they practically received no payment—to satisfy their taskmasters.") The Peruvian government was aware that there were cases of barbaric abuses perpetrated against Natives along the Ucayali and Marañon Rivers since at least 1903 and 1906. (Note: "Barbarities committed by the rubber-merchants upon the Indians of the Ucayali and Marañon were brought to the knowledge of the Peruvian Government in 1903 and 1906 by Roman Catholic missionaries established there and published by the Minister of Justice.") The demand for rubber was enormous due to its use in tyres for trucks, cars, and bicycles, whose manufacture had grown greatly in this period. Religious leaders such as Manuel Polit, Bishop of Cuenca in Ecuador, denounced these activities and worked to reform the system. Organisations such as the Sociedad Pro-Indigena also worked to improve conditions for indigenous workers. The local government at the time attempted to implement measures to control the abuses, but it was difficult in the large, sparsely populated countryside, which had few road connections to major cities. The Barbadian John Brown estimated that over the course of ten years, Arana's enterprise had been responsible for the deaths of 40,000 natives in the region, or 4,000 killings a year. In 1911, Judge Romulo Paredes was sent to investigate crimes perpetrated in the Peruvian Amazon Company territory, and he claimed that his commission could not find more than 7,000 natives in the area. Paredes estimated that a population which was numbered at 50,000 in 1906 by Carlos Rey de Castro had dropped down to 8,000 by 1911.

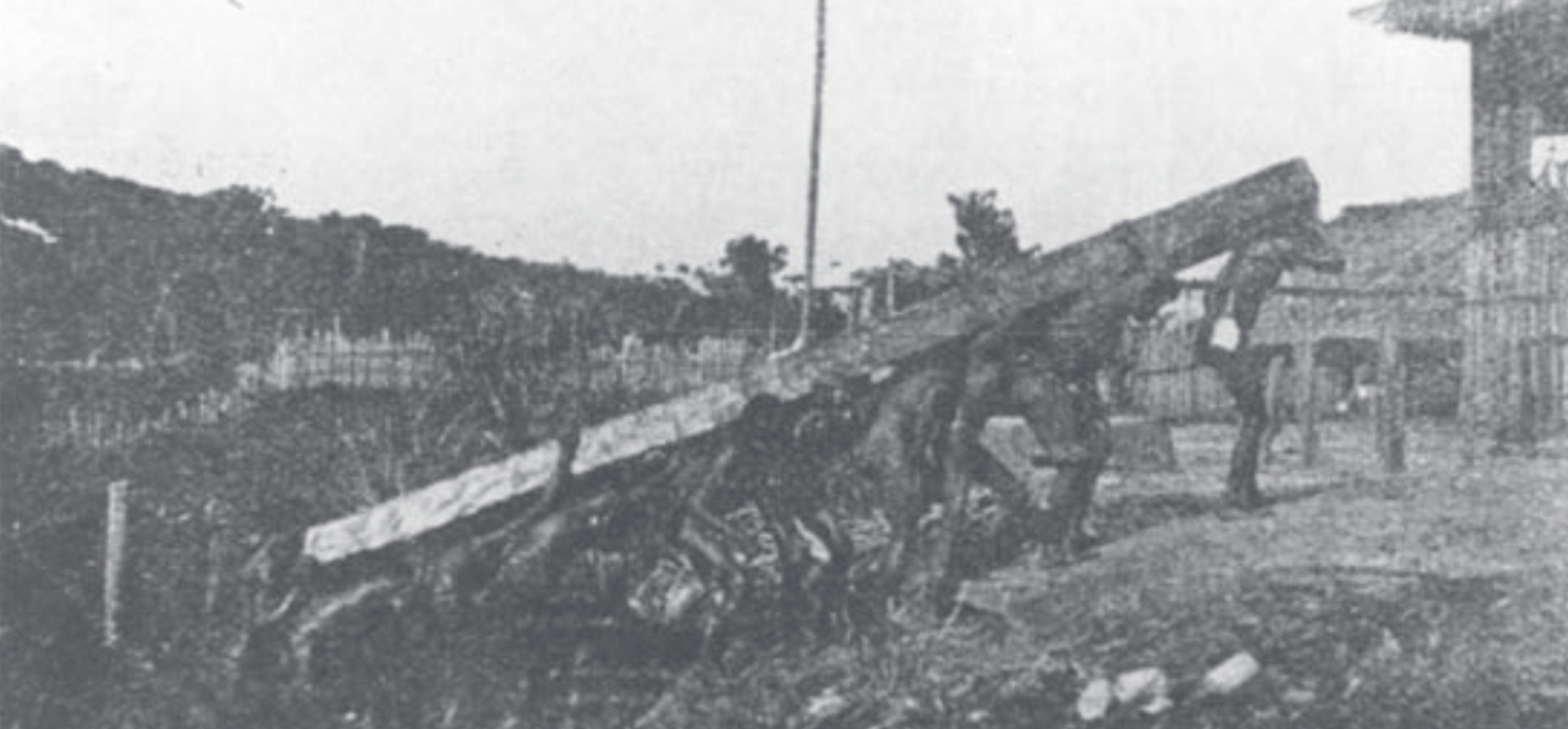
Indigenous Witoto workers at one of Julio César Arana's rubber plantations

Arana assumed the role of liquidator in September 1911, according to notices in the London Gazette, and a judge ordered the closure of the company in 1913. Following the company's closure, the receiver announced that shareholders would receive no returns, while creditors would receive only nominal amounts. The blame for the company's downfall was placed on the British directors, notably chaired by J. Russell Gubbins. In 1913, a Select Committee of the House of Commons published a report on its investigations. The committee stated that the board of directors could not avoid responsibility for the serious abuses uncovered under their company. It specifically singled out Sir John Lister Kaye, suggesting that he should be censured for accepting a directorship without understanding the company's operations, solely for financial gain, and for allowing his name to be exploited to attract investors.

Julio Arana voluntarily appeared before the Select Committee to contest the charges stemming from evidence gathered in the Putumayo. Despite examining the evidence, the committee concluded that Arana and his business partners in the rubber firm were aware of and accountable for the atrocities committed by their agents and employees in the Putumayo. However, Arana could not be held accountable in British Courts for actions committed in the Putumayo. He vehemently denied the occurrence of any atrocities and disclaimed any knowledge thereof.

One aspect of the Select Committee's investigation focused on the use of Winchester rifles. An inventory dated to February 1910 indicated that the total value of Winchester arms owned by the company was approximately £1,700. The committee's statement emphasised that neither the risk of frontier fighting, nor the alleged danger from the Indians, nor the occasional presence of the jaguar justified the large stock of rifles. They concluded that the rifles were primarily kept for the conquest and subjugation of the Indians. When Arana was questioned about the rifles, he argued that for the company staff to command respect, it was necessary for each employee to carry a Winchester rifle. The British board of directors was deemed not criminally liable under the Slave Trade Acts because they were not directly involved in the operations in Peru. However, Parliament and other entities sought to strengthen anti-slavery laws. The outbreak of World War I disrupted these efforts.

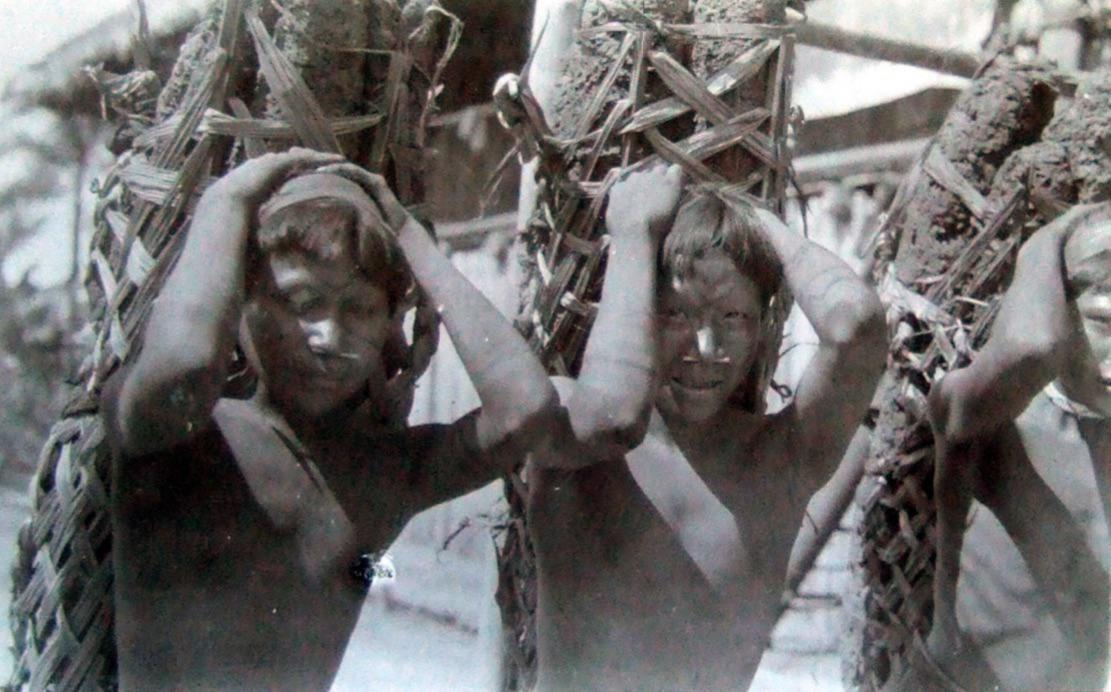
Enslaved natives carrying a load of rubber weighing 75 kilos; they have travelled 100 kilometres without being given any food. (Note: Casement weighed the rubber load of one young boy who was named Kaimeni. He was carrying a load of thirty kilos, while he weighed twenty nine and a half kilos.)

== Notable criminals of the company ==
The government of Peru sent a commission to investigate the region after the exposure of the atrocities. The head of this commission was Rómulo Paredes, who wrote an investigative report "embodying an enormous volume of testimony, of 3,000 pages involving wellnigh incredible charges of cruelty and massacre". He issued 237 arrest warrants against employees of the PAC. Many of these warrants were not acted on and were later dropped. Casement included a list of the most infamous criminals of the company in his report and the crimes they were indicted with. Regarding some of these criminals, Casement wrote:

Moreover, hundreds of crimes not recorded there have taken place. Normand, Aguero, Fonseca, Montt, Jimenez, the two Rodriguez brothers and Martinengui, have between them, murdered several thousand of these unhappy beings. There is no doubt of it. Tizon admitted to me in Chorrera last week that the two Rodriguez 'had killed hundreds of natives', and that Arana gave them 50% of the produce of these two sections, S. Catalina and Sabana. Normand is again and again charged by the Barbados men with killing many hundreds. Leavine today said 'over 500', that he had seen 20 Indians killed in five days in Matanzas alone, and the dead bodies eaten by the dogs and stinking round the house, so that he could not eat his food. These seven monsters have probably killed by shooting, flogging, beheading, burning, and got rid of by starvation some 5,000 Indians in the last seven years... Fonseca had killed hundreds, too, - and Martinengui... And this is done in the name of civilization and industrial development!"

— Roger Casement, The Amazon Journal of Roger Casement

=== Victor Macedo ===
Macedo managed La Chorrera before Arana arrived in the Putumayo region, and continued to manage the plantation until around 1909. In 1906, according to W.E. Hardenburg, Macedo ordered the deaths of any mutilated natives in the Putumayo. Hardenburg states: "for the following reasons: first, because they consumed food although they could not work; and second, because it looked bad to have these mutilated wretches running about. This wise precaution of Macedo's makes it difficult to find any mutilated Indians there, in spite of the number of mutilations; for, obeying this order, the executioners kill all the Indians they mutilate, after they have suffered what they consider a sufficient space of time." (Note: It was also reported that Macedo also stated: "The Indians are not here to plant chacaras. They are here to get rubber." The word Chacaras referred to the farms or gardens the natives made.) Macedo continued to work for the company after he was replaced as the manager for La Chorrera. Casement implicated Victor with attempting to bribe the Barbadians to withhold information, and cover up the atrocities. In 1910, Casement estimated that Macedo was making around £3,500 annually from the company. When the arrest warrant was issued for Macedo around 1913, it was telegraphed to him in Lima from Iquitos. Local police in Lima reportedly 'could not find him.' Macedo later went to court to protest the judge who issued the warrant, to drop the charges. The judge was soon dismissed from public service. Macedo had first-hand knowledge of the atrocities occurring in other sections, and often saw natives being flogged, sometimes on his orders. Macedo left the Putumayo River basin in February 1911, and an arrest warrant was issued against him on 29 July of that year. According to an article published by The Anti-Slavery Reporter and Aborigines' Friend in 1914, Macedo was frequently travelling between Manaus, the Japury River as well as the Acre River, with financial assistance provided to him by Julio Arana. Macedo temporarily settled near a place named Cobija, where four ex-managers of La Chorrera's agency were reportedly located. These four managers were Fidel Velarde, Abelardo Aguero, Augusto Jimenez, and Carlos Miranda. In September 1914, an arrest was made against Aguero, and an attempt was made against Jimenez however the local authorities were unable to locate Macedo.

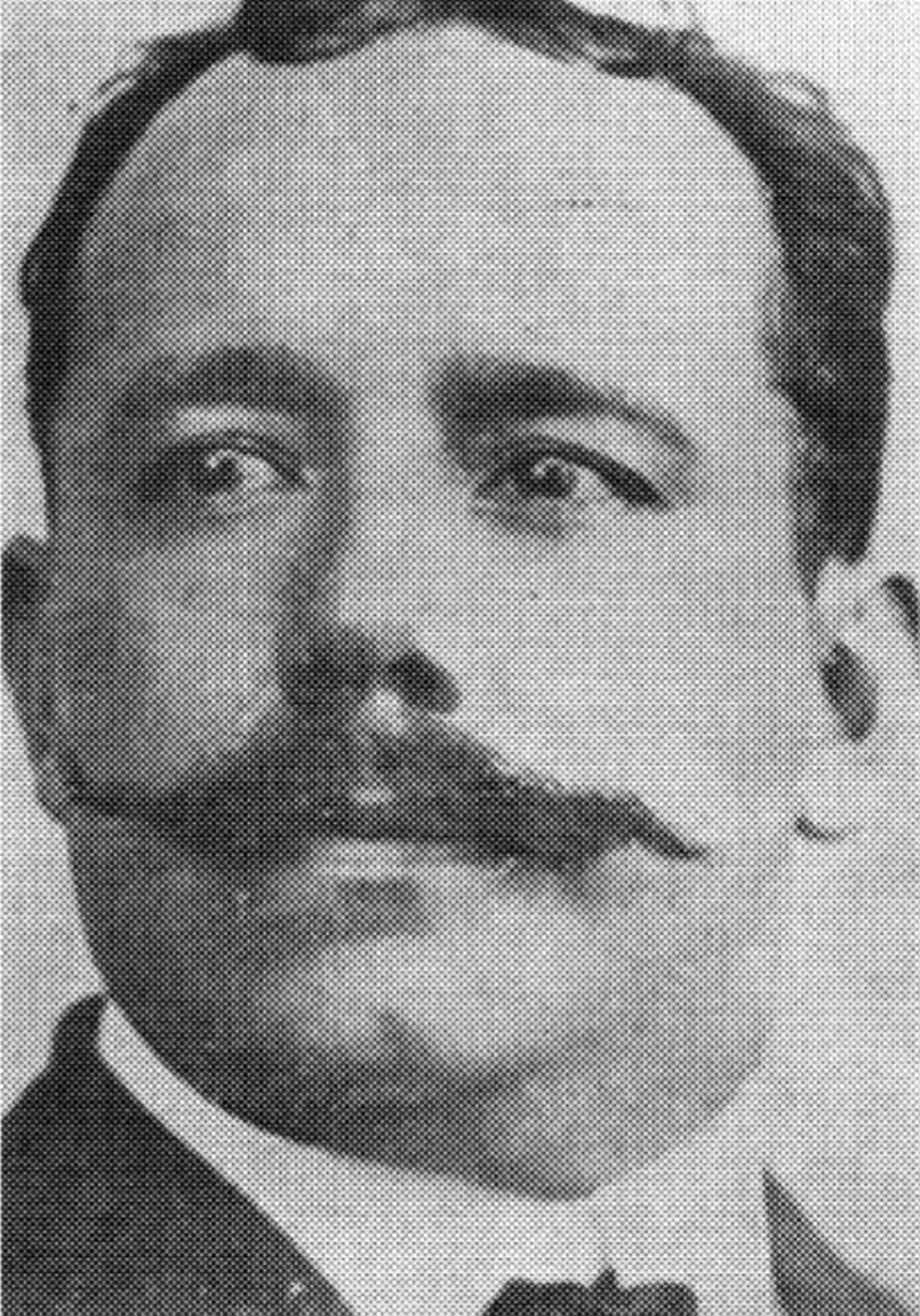
Victor Macedo

=== Miguel S. Loayza ===
Manager of El Encanto, the company's headquarters on the Caraparaná river, Miguel Loayza maintained a harem of around 13 indigenous girls, aged between 9 and 16, as noted by W.E Hardenburg. In 1910, Casement estimated that Loayza was receiving £2,500 annually from commission. After the liquidation of the company, Miguel retained his position as a manager in Arana's enterprise. Along with his brother Carlos, Loayza forced the migration of at least 6,719 people into the Ampiyacu basin around 1922, purportedly to retain their native workforce for Arana's operations. According to Carlos Loayza, 50% of these natives died from disease during the migration. Miguel and his brother persisted in extracting labour from these natives until the late 1950s. Miguel lived until around the 1960s, reaching his nineties before his death.

=== Armando Normand ===
A well-educated Bolivian, Normand was the manager of the Matanzas station, which he helped to establish. Casement referred to Normand as one of the worst criminals in the entire region of the Putumayo. There are multiple accounts regarding the crimes of Normand. He sanctioned slave raids, burned men and women with kerosene oil, cut off the arms and legs of natives, leaving them to die, bashed children to death, (Note: This allegation was corroborated by the Barbadian Westerman Levine.) forced women into relationships with him, and compelled them to have abortions. It has been reported that he murdered some of these 'concubines' forced to be his wife. Westerman Levine declared that Normand killed hundreds of natives during his time at Matanzas. Levine, a Barbadian hired by the company around the same time as Normand, also stated that on more than one occasion, he had seen Normand throw tied-up natives into a fire. One witness relayed to Roger Casement that he had seen ten natives killed and burned within a month and five days. Normand also kept trained dogs that ate the corpses of his victims and gnawed at the scattered limbs around Matanzas. Normand retained 20% of the profits made from the Matanzas station. At the time of Casement's visit in 1910, the company owed Normand around £1,800, and he was likely to receive another £300 that harvesting period. He was arrested in 1913 but escaped from jail in 1915, before ever facing trial. It is believed that Normand escaped to Brazil and changed his name.

=== Abelardo Agüero ===
Manager of the Abisinia plantation, Abelardo was said to have committed innumerable crimes against the natives around Abisinia. In 1907, a report published by the American consul at Iquitos stated that Abisinia had a population of one thousand and six hundred natives. However, by 1912, only one hundred and seventy natives remained at the station. An ex-employee of the company sent a letter to Benjamin Saldaña Rocca, describing an incident where the writer refused to shoot 35 natives as ordered by Abelardo. Since this employee refused, Abelardo ordered Augusto Jíminez to shoot the 35 men who were in chains. The crime of these 35 natives was that they tried to run away. Henry Gielgud informed Casement that Agüero had fled towards Colombia with a retinue of 'muchachos de confianza.' Before Agüero and his native killers left the Putumayo, they set fire to the Boras garden plots. At the time of Agüero's departure from the region, he owed the company between £500 or £600. He was arrested in Bolivia around September 1914 and he managed to temporarily escape from his captors however he was imprisoned again shortly afterwards. On 17 June 1916 Agüero issued a writ of Habeas Corpus that eventually led to his release.

=== Augusto Jíminez ===
Jíminez was a lieutenant to Abelardo Agüero at Abisinia, where he committed atrocities against the Boras. He later became the manager of the Morelia station and then Ultimo Retiro in 1908. Jíminez was implicated in many abuses and crimes against humanity during his employment in the Putumayo. He was responsible for multiple floggings, homicides, and immolations. The Hardenburg and Casement depositions provide details regarding two different "correrias," or "commissions," that Jimenez was in charge of. One first-hand account implicated him in the massacre of 35 natives, which was ordered by Abelardo Agüero. Juan Rosas relayed another incident, relating to fifteen natives dying of hunger. Jiménez ordered their execution instead of starving them, and then personally cut the leg off of one man. The native was then dragged away and burned. Jíminez was arrested but later escaped from justice and jail, fleeing to Brazil.

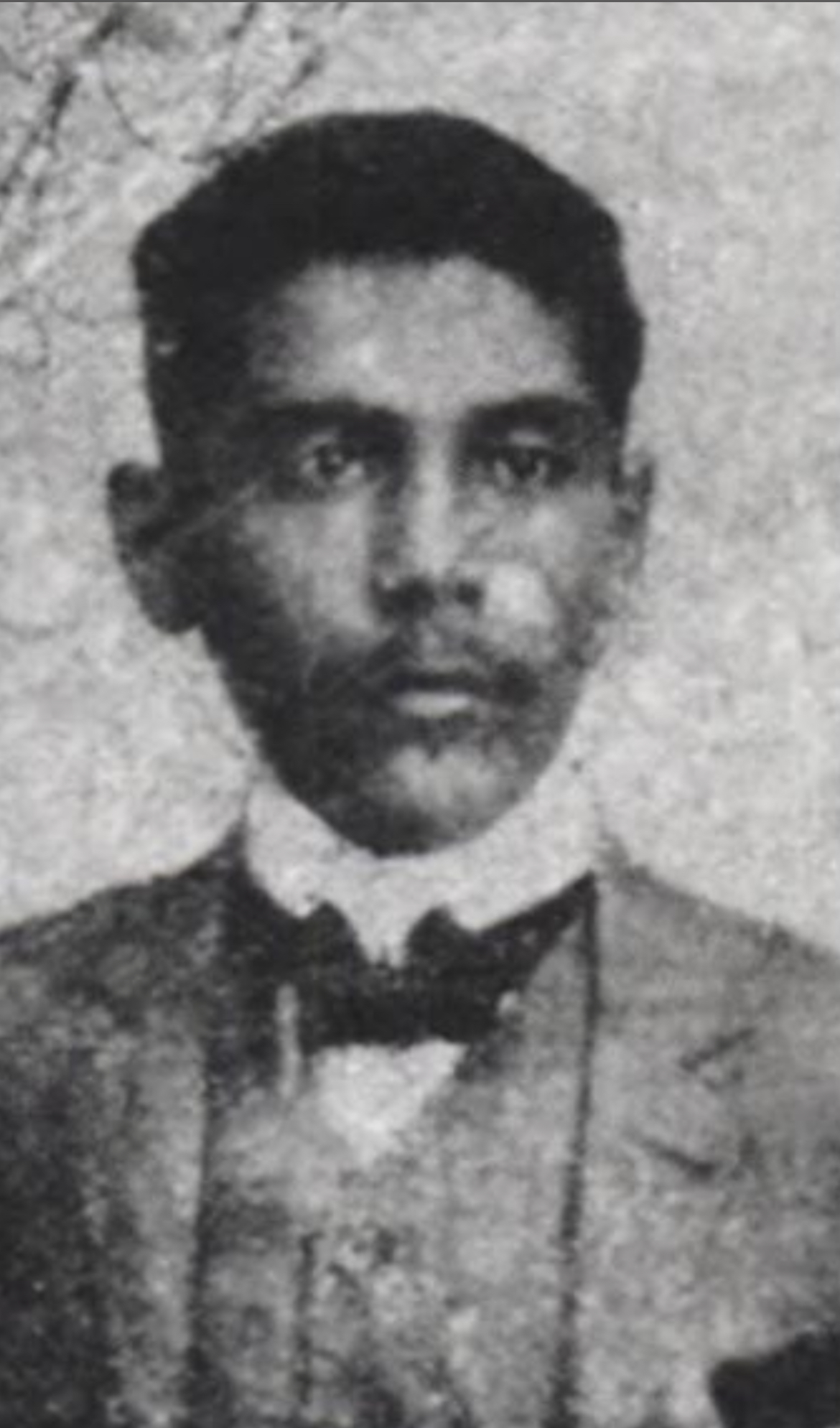
Augusto Jiménez, subchief of the 'Morelia' plantation

=== Fidel Velarde ===
Peruvian manager at Occidente, Velarde introduced a tortuous method of punishment involving water. The victim would have their hands tied behind their back before being forced underwater. Barbadian James Mapp admitted to witnessing four natives suffer this treatment. One of the natives managed to free himself but drowned in the river. Initially, Fidel ordered James to carry out this punishment, but James refused. An ex-employee named Roso España stated that the natives under Velarde suffered "castigations, flagellations, and clubbing. Some of these Indians suffered from awful wounds, many of them produced by firearms". Velarde told Roger Casement that at the time in 1910, he had five hundred and thirty natives collecting rubber for him at Occidente. Describing these workers, Casement said, "The men were all undersized, some half skeletons, at least very underfed". It was estimated that in 1910 Velarde's station would bring in 50 tons of rubber for the Peruvian Amazon Company. At the time of Velarde's departure from the region, he owed the company money.

=== Elías Martinengui ===
Many charges were levied against Martinengui. Roger Casement notes: "Martenengui worked his whole district to death, and gave the Indians no time to plant or find food. (Note: "During his term of service at Atenas he had wasted that region, and so oppressed the Indians that they were reduced to a condition of wholesale starvation, from which they had by no means recovered when we visited the district in October ... All the evidence we obtained showed that owing to the strain put upon them by Martenengui, the Atenas Indians had been unable to cultivate their own clearings, women as well as men being compelled to work rubber.") They had to work rubber or be killed, and to work and die ... [they are] walking fragments of humanity." Barbadian Frederick Bishop stated Martinengui alone was responsible for the condition of natives at Atenas. Reportedly, Martinengui worked them hard so that he'd have a large commission to retire with in Lima. Bishop also described an incident where Martinengui brutally murdered an enslaved concubine after he discovered she had a venereal disease.

Daniel Collantes, a Hardenburg deponent, claimed that during his employment at Atenas and under the management of Martinengui, he witnessed the killing of around sixty natives, men, women and children, and their corpses were burned. Collantes stated that eight days after this incident, Martinengui ordered a correria with the goal of exterminating a group of natives that did not bring in the amount of rubber Martinengui demanded. The members of this correria returned to Atenas four days later with severed fingers, ears, and several heads in order to prove that this order was carried out. The last reported sighting of Martinengui was in 1910, at Lima where he was still a free man.

=== Alfredo Montt ===
Peruvian manager at Atenas: the replacement of Elias Martinengui. Montt was previously the manager at Ultimo Retiro, where he committed atrocities. Natives were also starved to death in the stockades under management of Montt. Montt ordered innumerable floggings against the natives for either being short on rubber, or trying to run away. Like other managers of the company, Montt took women by force as concubines and killed their husbands if they protested. At the time of Montt's departure from the region, he owed money to the company. Roger Casement later found out that Alfredo Montt was tipped off before he could be arrested and fled to Brazil with a number of Bora natives. Casement made an attempt to have Montt and Fonseca arrested by Brazilian authorities between September and November 1911: however two commanders of the local authorities were bribed by the firm employing Montt and Fonseca. The pair managed to evade further attempts to have them incarcerated.

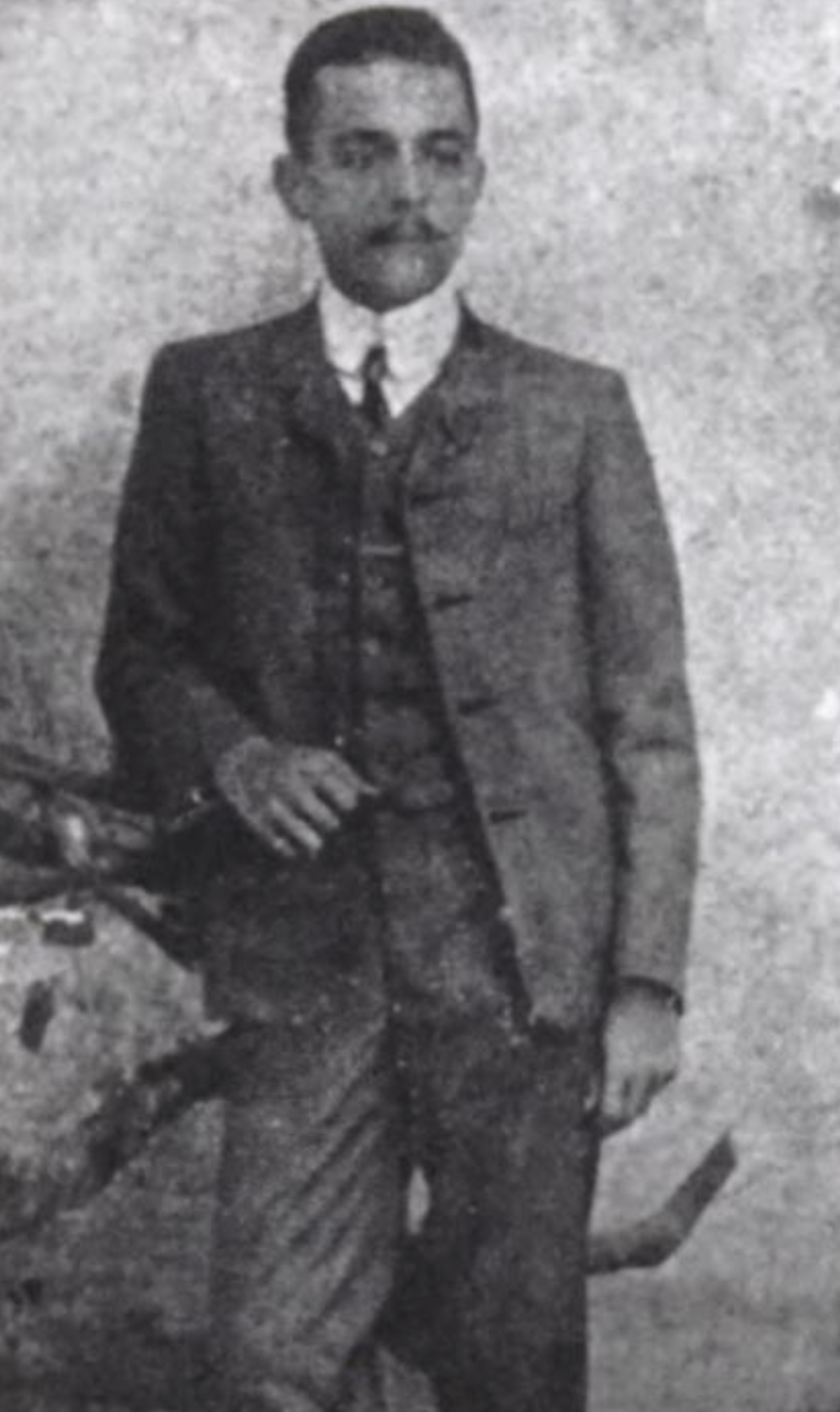
Alfredo Montt, manager of the Atenas rubber plantation

=== José Inocente Fonseca ===
A Peruvian overseer who perpetrated numerous crimes against the natives under his charge, Fonseca served as the manager of Ultimo Retiro. One firsthand account sent to Hardenburg implicates Fonseca in the massacre of 150 natives. According to Daniel Collantes, Fonseca initiated the massacre, assisted by six other employees, who killed men, women, and children. Daniel Collantes also recounted being dispatched on a correria, or "chasing" mission by Fonseca (the original order came from Macedo), with instructions to eliminate all Colombians they encountered. "He (Fonseca) also instructed them to bring back the fingers, ears, and some of the heads of the victims, preserved in salt, as proof that they had carried out these orders." Another firsthand account published by La Sancion in 1907 mentioned that Fonseca murdered one of his nine indigenous concubines out of suspected infidelity. This same firsthand account also describes an incident where Fonseca told his employees "Look, this is how we celebrate the sábado de gloria here", before shooting an indigenous man and a fifteen-year-old girl. The man died instantly, while the wounded girl was killed by another employee. After leaving the company, Fonseca, along with Alfredo Montt, was "living openly in Brazil," which had no extradition treaty with Peru. Fonseca and Montt were employed by a Brazilian firm named Edwards & Serra, the pair depended on the labor of 10 Boras people that they trafficked from La Sabana. Casement attempted to have Fonseca and Montt arrested however they were warned that local authorities nearby were seeking their incarceration.

=== Aurelio Rodríguez ===
Manager at the Santa Catalina station, Aurelio Rodríguez oversaw a reign of terror. An ex-employee, Genaro Caporo, recounted to W.E. Hardenburg that Rodríguez used the natives for target practice upon their arrival at the plantation in chains in 1908. Casement's report described Rodríguez's tenure as characterised by "wholesale murder and torture" until his departure from the Putumayo. Rodríguez ordered the construction of a special stockade designed for discomfort, where natives were subjected to flagellation and torture. Witness Juan Rosas described how Rodríguez executed a group of 40 natives, delivered to the plantation from a slave raid, one by one for target practice after they contracted smallpox in stocks. The manager of La Chorrera in 1910, Juan A. Tizon, confessed to Casement that Rodríguez and his brother Aristides had killed hundreds of indigenous people in the Putumayo, earning a 50% commission from rubber collections. Rodríguez retired with a "small fortune" and settled in Iquitos thereafter. After Rodriguez was arrested, Pablo Zumaeta entered a bond deal of £2,000 for his release. In May 1915 Rodriguez, Armando Normand and another criminal escaped from prison.

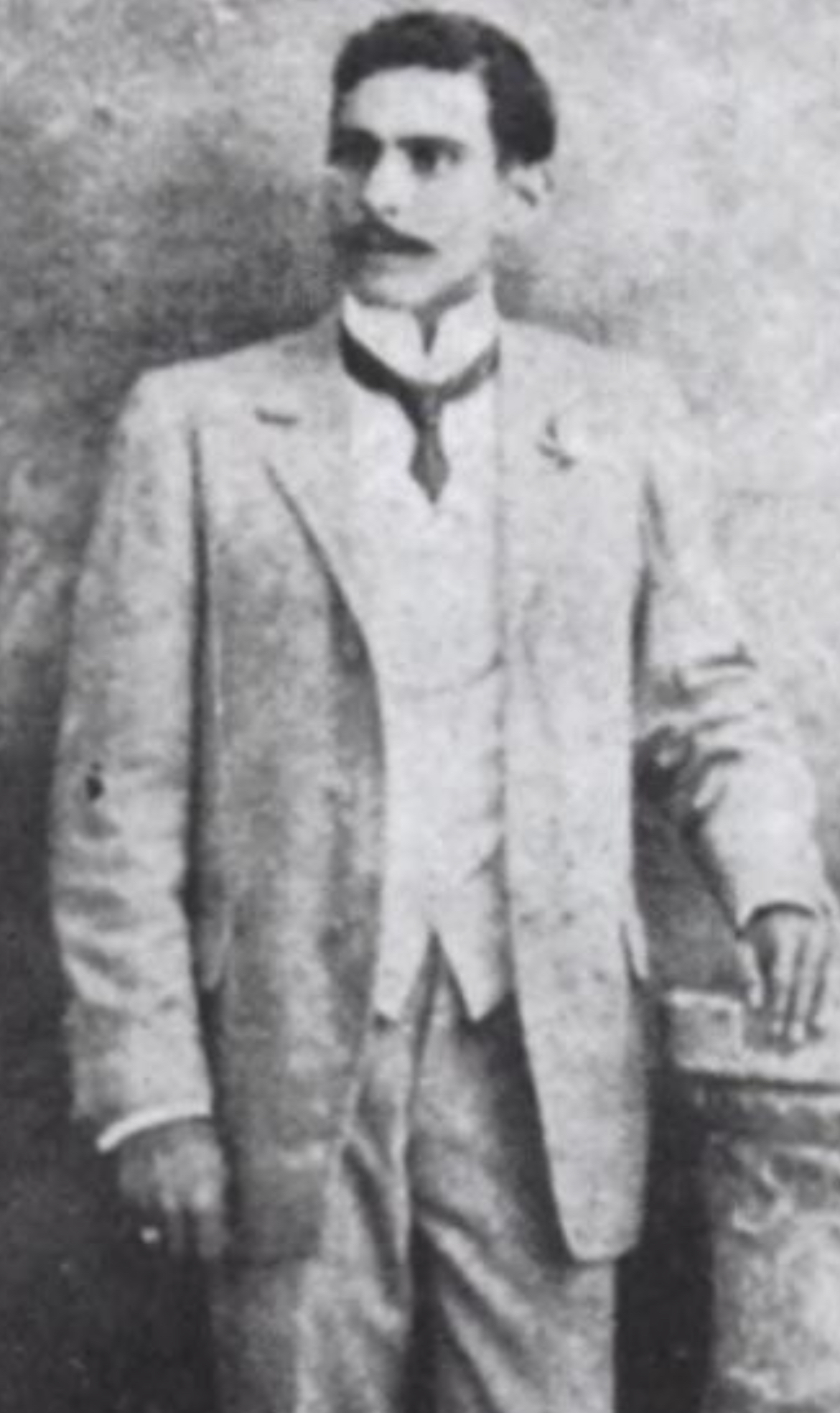
Aurelio Rodriguez, manager of the Santa Catalina rubber plantation

=== Aquiléo Torres ===
Aquiléo Torres was a Colombian that was initially apprehended by the company in 1906 for "poaching" on their premises. He was incarcerated by Armando Normand and Fidel Velarde for at least a year. Aquiléo was released under the condition that he joined the company. (Note: Michael Taussig, in reference to Torres, wrote: "When released he became one of Arana's most sadistic station managers, with an especial proclivity for dismembering Indians' bodies while they were still alive.") Initially, he was tasked with overseeing the punishment of the natives. It is alleged that Aquiléo was responsible for the deaths of numerous natives and frequently mutilated individuals by cutting off their ears while they were still alive. James Chase recounts an instance where he observed Torres sever the ear of a man before burning the man's wife alive in his presence. According to Casement "Aquileo Torres, I was told, was drowned - he disappeared at any rate. I was told he was drowned on Christmas day, 1910."

== Rubber collection centers ==
The land belonging to Arana was divided into two administrative divisions: La Chorrera along the Igaraparaná river, and El Encanto along the Caraparaná river. According to the company prospectus issued in 1907, the Chorrera agency encompassed over forty stations that produced rubber, whereas the El Encanto agency had approximately eighteen stations. By September 1910, La Chorrera's agency only consisted of ten rubber stations and employed 101 salaried agents at those stations. (Note: Similar information regarding El Encanto's composition is not included in the document "Slavery in Peru" as the author, Roger Casement, was more familiar with La Chorrera.)

Rubber collection centers
Name	Notable Manager(s)	Headquarters
La Chorrera	Victor Macedo	Iquitos
La Sabana	Aristides Rodriguez	La Chorrera
Santa Catalina	Aurelio Rodriguez	La Chorrera
Atenas	Elias Martinengui	La Chorrera
Entre Rios	Andrés O'Donnell	La Chorrera
Occidente	Fidel Velarde	La Chorrera
Matanzas	Armando Normand	La Chorrera
La China	Armando Normand	La Chorrera
Ultimo Retiro	Jose Inocente Fonseca	La Chorrera
Abisinia	Abeldaro Agüero, Alfredo Montt	La Chorrera
Santa Julia	Manuel Aponte, Augusto Jiménez Seminario	La Chorrera
Sur	Carlos Miranda	La Chorrera
El Encanto	Miguel S. Loayza	El Encanto
Argelia	Tobias Calderon	El Encanto
Esmeraldas	Artemio Muñoz	El Encanto
Nueva Granada		El Encanto
Esperanza		El Encanto
Indostan		El Encanto
Porvenir	Bartolomé Guevara	El Encanto
La Florida		El Encanto
La Sombra		El Encanto

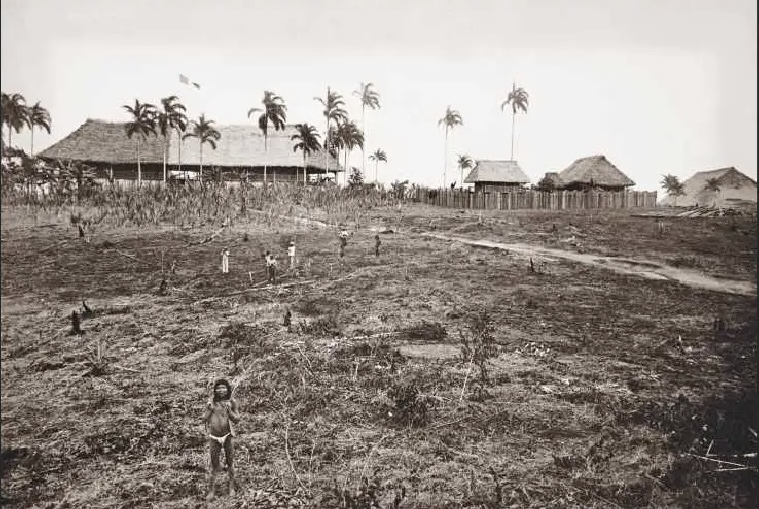
"The Entre Ríos station is situated in the midst of an expansive clearing spanning over 900,000 square meters."

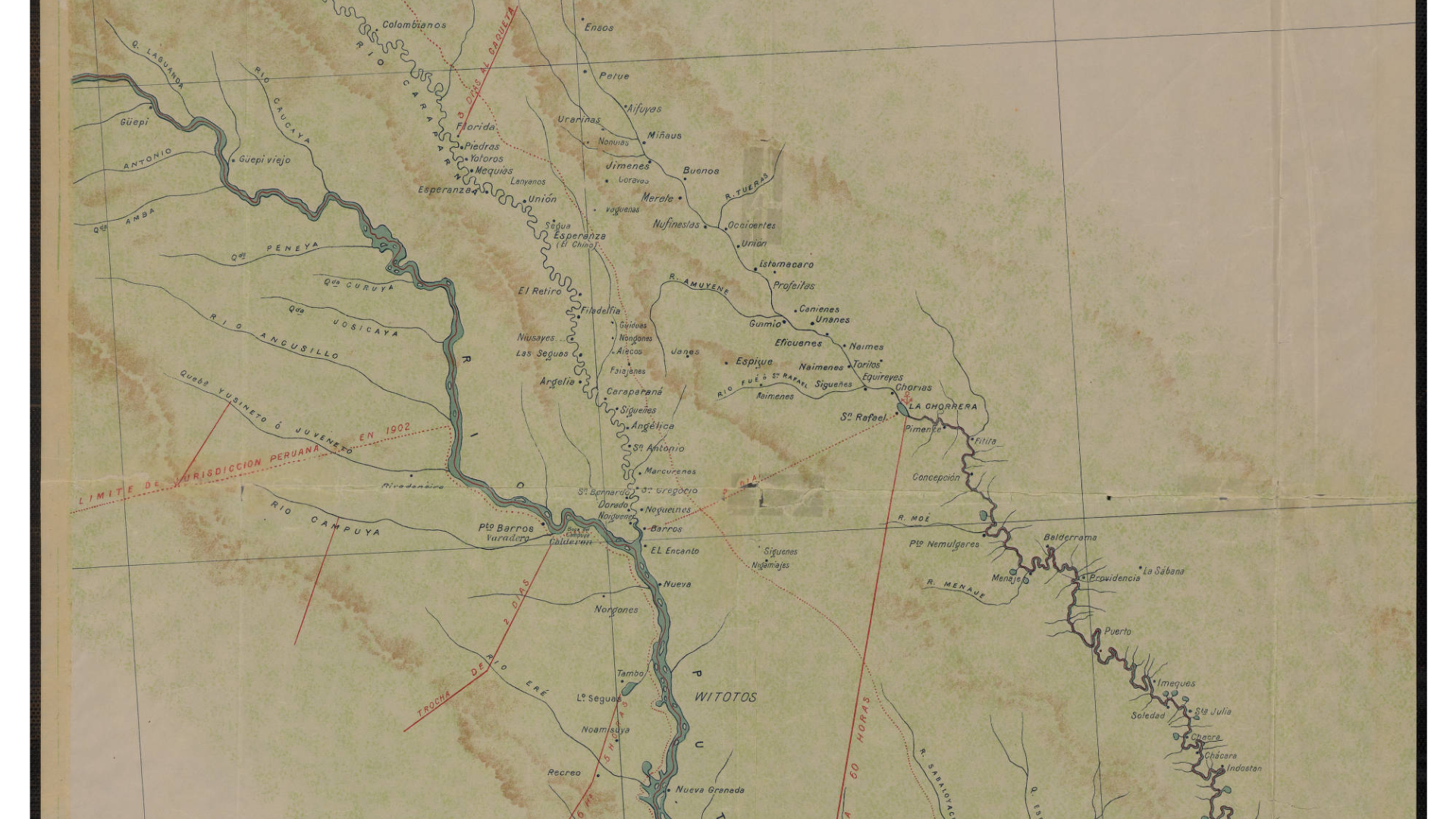
Map of the Putumayo River, circa 1908, featuring the names and positions of rubber plantations

== Aftermath ==
After the Peruvian Amazon Company was liquidated, Arana and a number of his associates retained property in the Putumayo region, and effective control of the indigenous population. An unknown number of natives were forcefully relocated to other regions of the Amazon, where they continued to extract rubber. (Note: In 1916, there was a "Agüero y Jiménez" exporting rubber from the Tahuamanu River with eighteen Huitoto families. It may be possible this is Abelardo Agüero and Augusto Jiménez Seminario.) In 1911, it was reported several of the company's employees against whom arrest warrants had been issued had escaped from the region with up to 500 natives.

Several of those notable criminals included Abelardo Agüero, Augusto Jimenez Seminario, Alfredo Montt, Jose Inocente Fonseca and Armando Normand. Agüero and Jimenez trafficked "around seventy natives" from the Putumayo towards the Acre River basin, they were arrested in 1914 however Jimenez managed to escape while Agüero was imprisoned until 1916. He filed a writ of Habeas corpus in 1916, which eventually led to his release from prison. On November 28 of 1911, Casement was informed that around twenty seven PAC agents with active arrest warrants were allowed by the captain of the Liberal steamship to board Liberal and disembark in Brazilian territory, away from Peruvian authorities. Casement attempted to arrest Montt and Inocente Fonseca near the end of 1911 however their bribery of local authorities allowed the pair to escape. At the time Montt and Inocente Fonseca had 10 Boras people with them which they depended upon to make money. Armando Normand was arrested in 1912 however he escaped from prison in May 1915 along with the manager of Santa Catalina, Aurelio Rodriguez, prior to a verdict in their court case.

In 1912, an Irish missionary named Leo Sambrook and three other men travelled to Putumayo to set up a Franciscan mission. Sambrook noted the abuses in the area continued and in 1916, he reported a rebellion had occurred at the Atenas rubber station. (Note: According to the information in The Devil and Mr Casement, the natives rebelled after a forced march of three days to find rubber, for which they received little food. The natives killed nine men working for Arana.) This rebellion consisted of 900 men, mostly Boras natives. A month later, Sambrook reported Peruvian soldiers had quelled the rebellion. (Note: Some of whom were armed with machine guns.) The Atenas area was recaptured, the houses of natives were burnt down, and the survivors were rounded up. According to Capuchin friar Gaspar de Pinell's information, an uprising against Arana's company occurred along the Igaraparaná River in 1917 and he wrote that a company of Peruvian soldiers with a machine gun suppressed the rebellion. Gaspar de Pinell had access to a census conducted by Arana's enterprise in 1917 which stated Arana's company had 2,300 natives dedicated to the extraction of rubber on the Caraparaná River, while on the Igaraparaná there were around 6,200 dedicated to extracting rubber. Researcher and author Jordan Goodman suggests that the rebellion reported by Sambrook may be the same incident as the Yarocamena uprising, which also originated at Atenas. Two examinations on the oral history of the Yarocamena rebellion were published in 1985 and 1989, the first article was titled "La rabia de Yarocamena". The second article was named "Historia oral de una maloca sitiada en el amazonas: aspectos de la rebelión de yarocamena contra la casa arana, en 1917".

Before the Peruvian and Colombian border changed in the 1920s, Miguel S. Loayza and his brother Carlos forced the migration of at least 6,719 Putumayo natives into the Ampiyacu region of Peru. According to Miguel's brother, around half of those natives died due to disease and other factors during the journey. (Note: Julio Arana also had a role in initiating these forced migrations.) The surviving natives from this group continued to work for the Loayzas until the late 1950s.
