= Sir John Lister-Kaye, 3rd Baronet =

Sir John Lister-Kaye Bt OBE DL
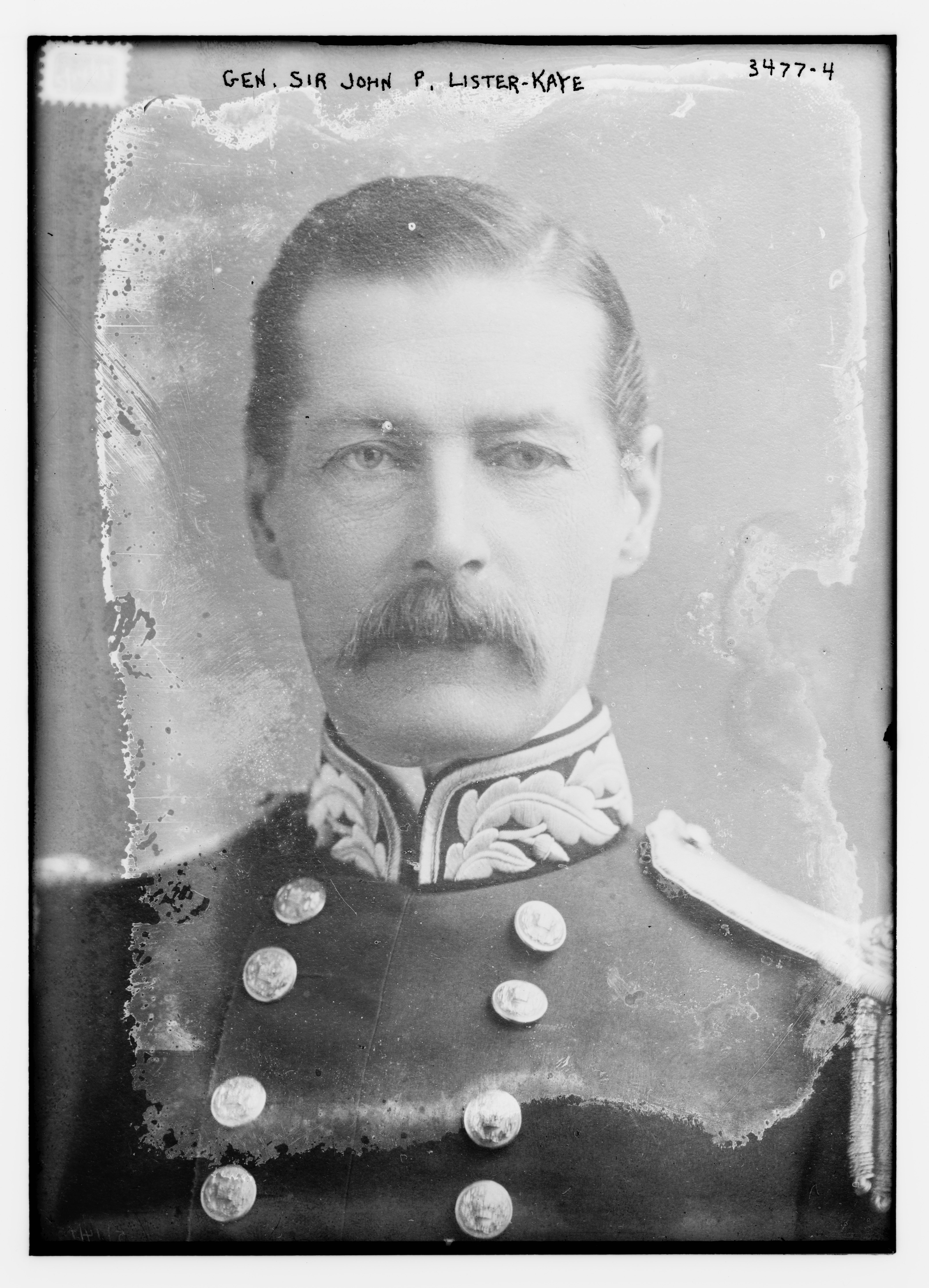

Groom in Waiting to King Edward VII
- In office 4 June 1908 – 10 June 1910

Personal details
- Born: John Pepys Lister-Kaye; 18 February 1853
- Died: 27 May 1924 (aged 71) London, England
- Spouse: Natica Yznaga (m. 1881)
- Relations: Charles Pepys, 1st Earl of Cottenham (grandfather)
- Children: 1
- Parent(s): Lister Lister-Kaye; Lady Caroline Pepys
- Education: Eton College
- Alma mater: Trinity College, Cambridge

Military service
- Branch/service: Royal Horse Guards; Yorkshire Hussars
- Rank: Lieutenant

Sir John Pepys Lister-Kaye, 3rd Baronet, OBE, DL (18 February 1853 – 27 May 1924), was a Groom in Waiting to his friend, King Edward VII.

== Early life ==
Lister-Kay was born on 18 February 1853. He was the eldest son of Lister Lister-Kaye (1827–1855) and the former Lady Caroline Pepys. His brother was Cecil Edmund Lister-Kaye. His father died on 12 April 1855, at age twenty-seven, predeceasing John's grandfather, the 2nd Baronet. His mother, who never remarried died in January 1902.

His paternal grandparents were Sir John Lister-Kaye, 2nd Baronet (eldest son of Sir John Lister Kaye, 1st Baronet and Lady Amelia Grey) and the former Matilda Arbuthnot (sole heiress of George Arbuthnot). His great-uncle was the cricketer George Lister-Kaye. His maternal grandparents were Lord High Chancellor of Great Britain Charles Pepys, 1st Earl of Cottenham and the former Caroline Elizabeth Wingfield (daughter of William Wingfield MP for Bodmin and Lady Charlotte Digby).

== Career ==
Lister-Kaye was educated at Eton College and Trinity College, Cambridge.

On 13 April 1871, upon the death of his paternal grandfather, he succeeded as the 3rd Baronet Lister-Kaye of Grange. He gained the rank of Lieutenant in the Royal Horse Guards and Yorkshire Hussars. He held the office of Groom-in-Waiting to King Edward VII from 4 June 1908 to 10 June 1910, with whom he was a close friend.

He was appointed Officer of the Order of the British Empire and served as Deputy Lieutenant of the West Riding of Yorkshire.

In November 1914, Sir John appeared before the Bankruptcy Court in London attributing his troubles "to the financing of a company formed to develop property in Croatia, in Hungary." His discharge was suspended for two years in March 1915. He later ran farms in California and Canada, and "is said to have lost half a million dollars in the ventures." He "also had large concessions in the Far East."

== Personal life ==
On 5 December 1881, he was married to María de la Natividad "Natica" Yznaga, daughter of diplomat Antonio Modesto Yznaga del Valle and Ellen Maria Clement at Grace Church in New York City. Her father was from an old Cuban family who owned a large plantation and sugar mills in the vicinity of Trinidad, Cuba; they had connections to several Spanish aristocratic families. Among her family was brother Fernando Yznaga, and sister Consuelo Yznaga (who became the Duchess of Manchester upon her marriage to George Montagu, 8th Duke of Manchester in 1876). Together, John and Natica lived at Denby Grange were the parents of one child:

- John Digby Lister-Kaye (1882–1882), who died in infancy.

Sir John died on 27 May 1924, at age 71, from angina pectoris in a London nursing home. He was succeeded in his title by his younger brother, Sir Cecil Lister-Kaye, 4th Baronet. His widow, Lady Lister-Kay died in her apartment at the Hotel Ambassador on 13 February 1943 at age 83.

Baronetage of the United Kingdom
Preceded by John Lister Lister-Kaye	Baronet (of Grange); 1871–1924	Succeeded by Cecil Edmund Lister-Kaye
