= Lister-Kaye =

Lister-Kaye is a surname. Notable people with the surname include:

- George Lister-Kaye (1803–1871), English cricketer
- John Lister-Kaye (born 1946), English naturalist, conservationist, and author
- Kenelm Lister-Kaye (1892–1955), English cricketer
