= Sir John Lister Kaye, 1st Baronet =

English cricketer and baronet

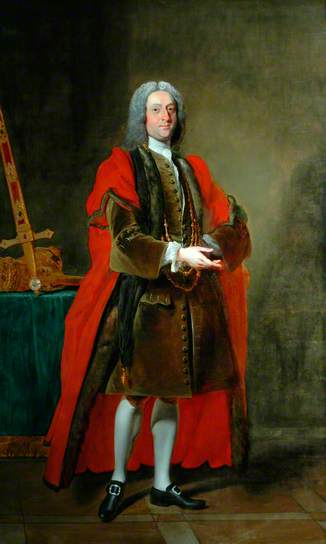
Sir John Lister Kaye, 1st Baronet, as Lord Mayor of York

Sir John Lister-Kaye, 1st Baronet (1772 – 28 February 1827) was an English amateur cricketer in the late 18th century. His career spanned the 1787 to 1798 seasons and he played mainly for Marylebone Cricket Club and Surrey. He made 12 known appearances in important matches.

An illegitimate son of a baronet, he was created a baronet in his own right in December 1812 when he inherited the Lister estates by will. He lived at Denby Grange near Wakefield, Yorkshire. One of his sons, George Lister-Kaye (1803–1871), made a single cricket appearance for Sussex in 1828.

== Early life ==
John Lister-Kaye was born at Denby Grange between Wakefield and Huddersfield in the West Riding of Yorkshire. The illegitimate son of Sir John Lister-Kay, 5th Baronet of Denby Grange, he was the sole heir to both the Lister and Kaye families, ancient Yorkshire pedigrees stretching back to the Middle Ages. One son of Kaye married into the Tory Squires family, Danby knights of Masham. On 4 February 1641, Sir John of Woodsome rode out in support of King Charles I and was created a baronet for his services to the Royalist army. He died unmarried in 1789, leaving his estates to his natural son, while the title devolved to his younger half-brother, Sir Richard Kaye, 6th Baronet who was Dean of Lincoln Cathedral. Having no legitimate children, the baronetcy expired on the sixth baronet's death on Christmas Day 1809.

=== Yorkshire gentry ===
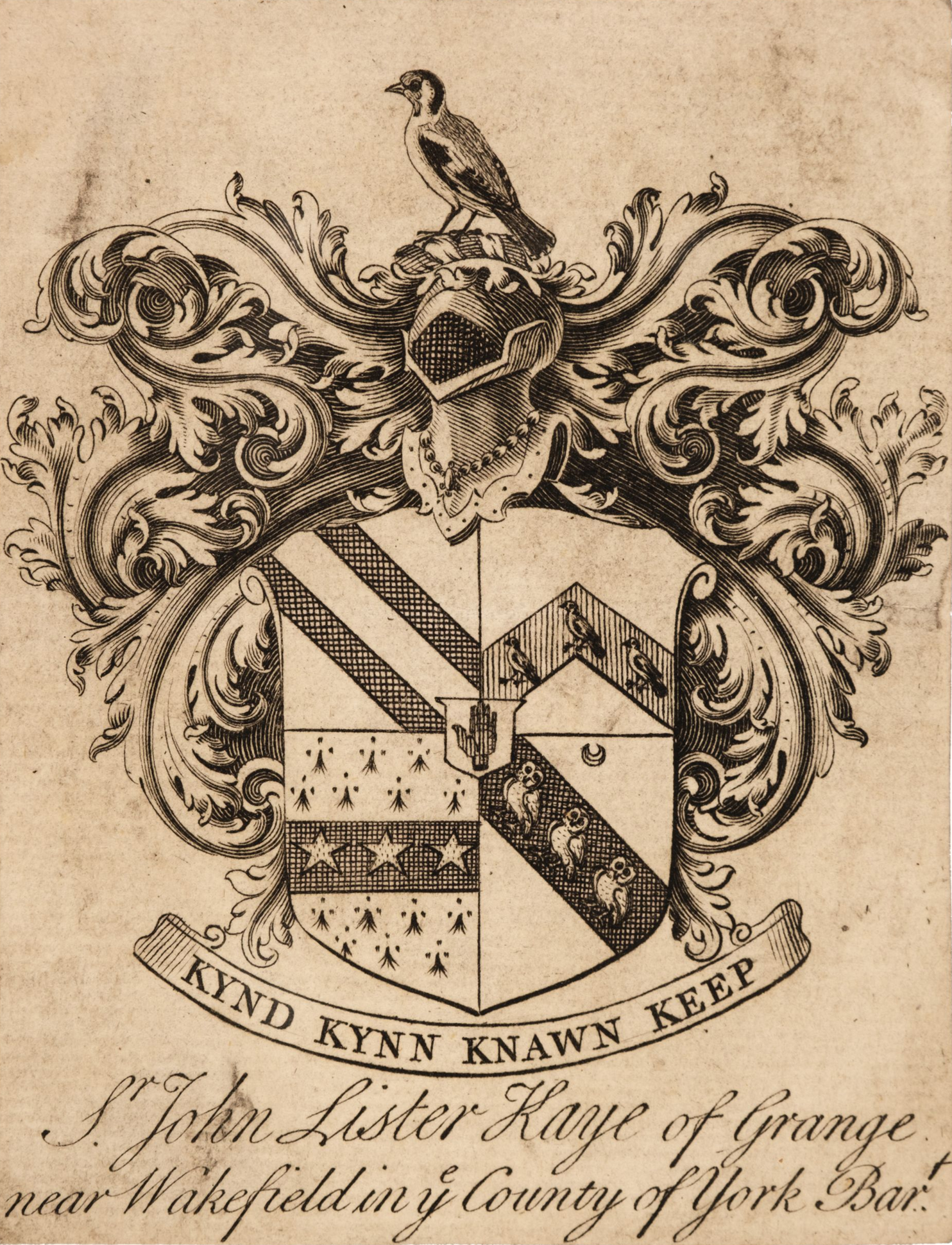
sir John Lister Kaye's bookplate

Sir John's acquisition of the landed estates devised on him was the cause for entitlement for a baronetcy, when George III created a new title by patent on 28 December 1812. His land included the Manors of Burton (or Kirkburton), Woodsham, Shelley and other lands in Yorkshire. The country was at war with France and under very serious threat of invasion. The Yorkshire squirearchy was designated responsibility for being officers of the local militia mobilised to keep law and order and police the coasts of England, as nightwatchmen. Their powers had been created by parliament in the Militia Act 1757, which remained in force for a century.

== Personal life ==
On 18 October 1800, Sir John was married to Lady Amelia Grey at Bowden Church in Cheshire. Lady Amelia was the sixth daughter of George Grey, Earl of Stamford and Warrington. The society marriage strengthened his entitlement. The couple had four sons and six daughters:

- Sir John Lister-Kaye, 2nd Baronet (1801–1871), who married Matilda Arbuthnot, sole heiress of George Arbuthnot, on 21 October 1824.
- George Lister-Kaye (1803–1871), a Captain of the 10th Dragoons.
- Amelia Mary Lister Kaye (1803–1826), who married Falkiner Caleb Arthur Chute Sandes.
- Arthur Lister Kaye (1805–1834), who became rector of Thornton, Yorkshire.
- Sophia Lister Kaye (1807–1807)
- Sophia Charlotte Lister Kaye (1809–1877), who married Rev. Henry Spencer Markham of Clifton Rectory, Nottinghamshire.
- Louisa Lister Kaye (b. 1810)
- Henrietta Emilia Lister Kaye (1811–1878)
- Maria Lister Kaye (b. 1813)
- Henry Lister Lister-Kaye (b. 1814)
- Georgiana Lister Kaye (1815–1877), who married William Ford Hulton of Hulton Park.

When Sir John sold a portion of the Burton inheritance in 1827, it devolved on the Sykes family of Sledmere. Sir John died on 28 February 1827 and was succeeded in the baronetcy by his eldest son, Sir John.

== Arms ==
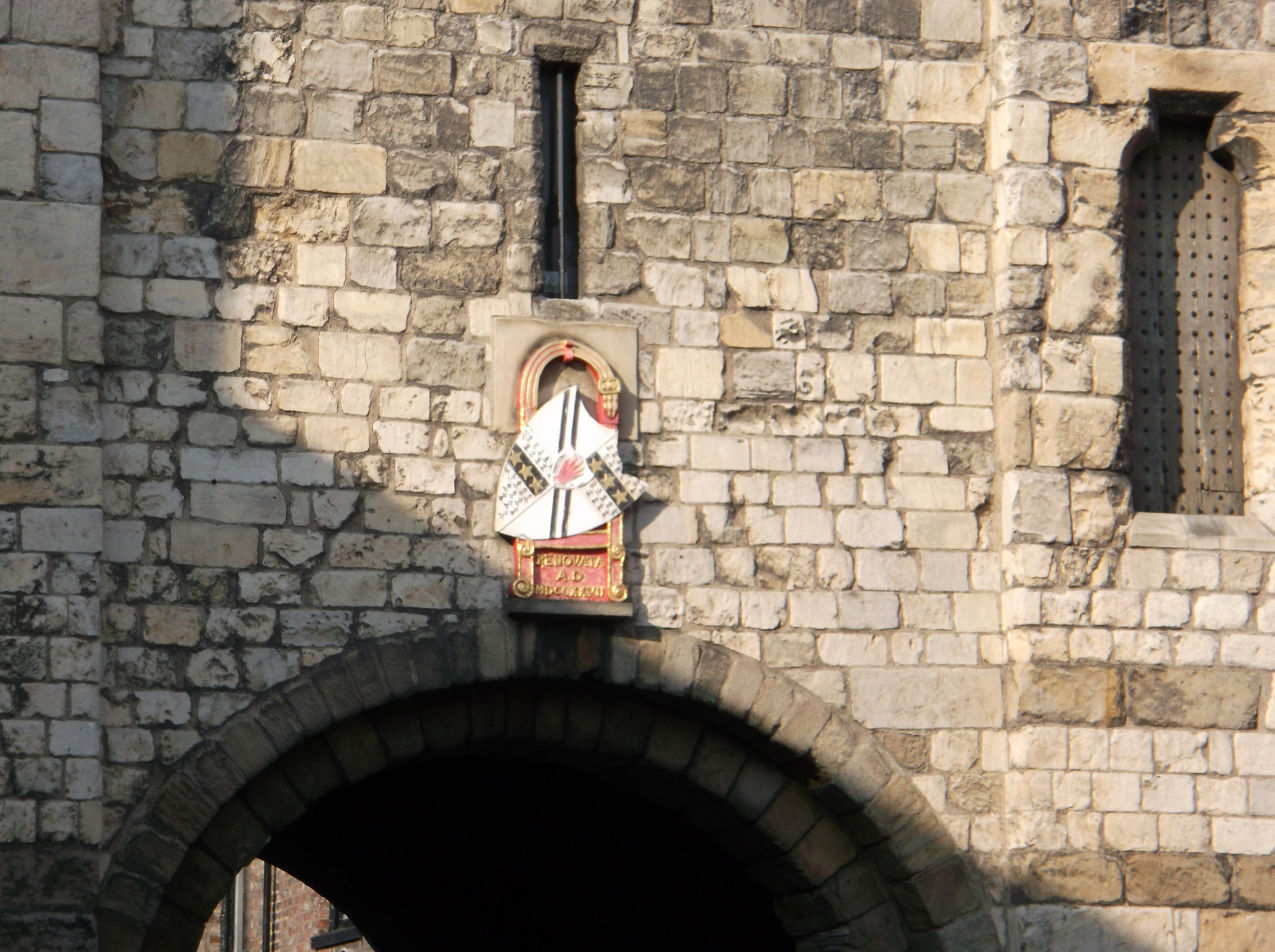
Sir John Lister Kaye's coat of arms on the Micklegate Bar

Arms: Quarterly, 1st & 4th: Argent, two bendlets sable (Kaye); 2nd & 3rd: Ermine, on a fess sable three mullets or (Lister); the whole within a bordure wavy azure.

Crests: 1) A goldfinch proper, charged on the breast with a rose gules (Kaye). 2) A buck's head erased proper attired or, in the mouth a bird bolt bendways of the same, flighted argent (Lister).

Motto: "Kynd kynn knowne kepe"

His arms can be seen in relief on the Micklegate Bar, York.

Baronetage of the United Kingdom
| New creation | Baronet (of Grange); 1812–1827 | Succeeded by John Lister-Kaye |
