= George Lister-Kaye =

English military lieutenant-colonel and cricketer

George Lister-Kaye (14 November 1803 – 18 September 1871) was an English cricketer who played for Sussex. He was born in Wakefield and died in Heworth.

Lister-Kaye made a single first-class appearance for the team, against Kent in 1828. Batting in the upper-middle order, he scored two runs in the first innings and three runs in the second.

Lister-Kaye was Lieutenant-colonel of the West Yorkshire Militia, formerly called the 10th Hussars. He married on 24 August 1847, Louisa Jessie, second daughter of Captain Dowker of West Huntington Hall, Yorkshire, and died on 18 September 1871, having had issue:

- Charles Wilkinson (28 March 1849 – ? ) married 5 May 1881, Lucy Adela, daughter of John Champion of Ranby House, Notts and died on 8 Jan
- Alan (21 August 1854 – 25 August 1925) married on 12 June 1879 Mary Jane, eldest daughter of Rev Edward Stansfield, Vicar of Rustington, Sussex
- Jessie Maria (1856 – 26 August 1929) married on 6 February 1872 Joseph Charlton Parr
- Louisa (? – 9 October 1946), a spinster
