= Arana (surname) =

Arana is a surname that originates in Spain. Notable people with the surname include:

== Arts and entertainment ==
- Agustín Arana (born 1968), Mexican actor
- Alfonso Arana (1927–2005), Puerto Rican painter
- Facundo Arana (born 1972), Argentine actor
- Francisco Infante-Arana (born 1943), Russian artist
- Gabriel Arana (born 1983), American journalist
- Henry Arana (1921–2008), Puerto Rican composer
- Hugo Arana (1943–2020), Argentine actor
- Iván Arana, Mexican actor
- Lucrecia Arana (1871–1927), Spanish opera singer
- Tomas Arana (born 1955), American actor
- Txe Arana (born 1972), Catalan actor
- Marie Arana, Peruvian-American writer, novelist, literary critic
- Sandra Arana (born 1973), American-Peruvian actress, model, and television presenter

== Politics and law ==
- Carlos Manuel Arana Osorio (1918–2003), former president of Guatemala
- Diego Barros Arana (1830–1907), Chilean historian
- Fernando Ortíz Arana (born 1944), Mexican politician
- Francisco Javier Arana (1905–1949), Guatemalan military leader
- Julio César Arana (1894–1952), Peruvian entrepreneur and politician
- Jorge Arana Arana (born 1960), Mexican politician
- José Manuel Fortuny Arana (1916–2005), Guatemalan politician
- Luis Arana (1862–1951), Basque Nationalist Party leader after Sabino Arana's death
- Marco Arana (born 1962), Peruvian politician, sociologist, and activist
- Mariano Arana (1933–2023), Uruguayan architect and politician
- Mario Germán Iguarán Arana (born 1960), Colombian lawyer
- Michelle Arana (born 1969), Belizean judge
- Sabino Arana (1865–1903), founder of political Basque nationalism
- Teodoro de Arana y Beláustegui (1858–1945), Spanish Carlist politician

== Sports ==
- Amado Arana (1879–?), Spanish footballer
- Agustín Sauto Arana (1908–1986), Basque footballer
- Alejandro Arana (born 1997), Mexican footballer
- Álvaro de Arana (1904–1937), Spanish sailor
- Darío de Arana (1882–?), Spanish footballer
- Diego de Arana (1468–1493), Castilian sailor
- Ezequiel Arana (born 1986), Spanish footballer
- Guilherme Arana (born 1997), Brazilian footballer
- Hector Arana, American motorcycle racer
- Javier de Arana (1905–1975), Spanish golfer and sailor
- José Antonio Arana (1872–1909), Spanish footballer
- Luis Arana (sailor) (1874–1951), Spanish sailor and footballer
- Luis Ignacio de Arana (1909–1999), Spanish golfer
- Manuel Arana (born 1984), Spanish footballer
- Mario Arana (1884–1931), Spanish footballer
- Óscar de Marcos Arana (born 1989), Spanish footballer
- Ronald Arana (born 1977), Bolivian footballer
- Ryan Araña, Filipino basketball player

== Others ==
- Beatriz Enríquez de Arana (1467–1536), Spanish woman who was the mistress of Christopher Columbus
- Juan Antonio de Urrutia y Arana, colonial Mexican nobleman
- Maribel Arana (born 1985), Guatemalan model

== See also ==
- Arana (disambiguation)
- Arano (surname)
