= Arano (surname) =

Arano is a surname.

- Carlos Arano (born 1980), Argentinian football player, also known as Chiche Arano
- Cristián Arano (born 1995), Bolivian football player
- Francisco Arano Montero (born 1950), Mexican politician
- Francisco Lara Arano (born 1959), Mexican politician
- Himeka Arano (born 2002), Japanese member of SKE48
- Paul Arano Ruiz (born 1995), Bolivian football player
- Ramón Arano (1939–2012), Mexican baseball player
- Takuma Arano (born 1993), Japanese football player
- Víctor Arano (born 1995), Mexican baseball player

== See also ==
- Arano (disambiguation)
- Arana (surname)
