= TXE (disambiguation) =

TXE (Telephone eXchange Electronic) was a family of telephone exchanges developed by the British General Post Office.

TXE or Txe may also refer to:

- Rembele Airport, Sumatra, Indonesia, IATA airport code TXE
- Trusted Execution Engine, firmware of the Intel Management Engine
- Totoli language, a Sulawesi language, ISO 639-3 language code txe
- Gas Gas TXE, a model of electric motorbike
- Txe Arana, Catalan actress and television host
