= Andrés O'Donnell =

Agent of the Peruvian Amazon Company

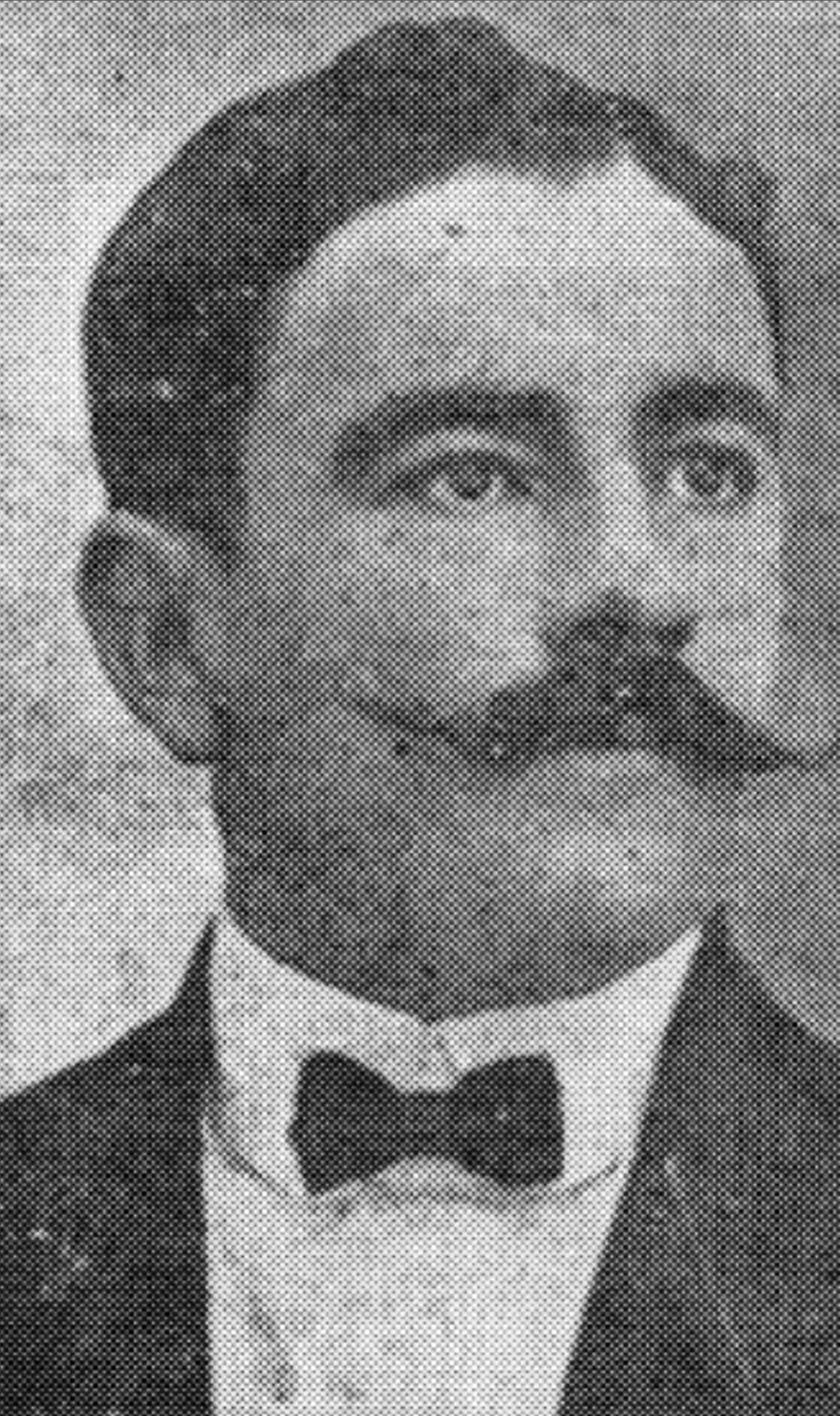
- O'Donnell circa 1911
- Born: Andrés Avalino O'Donnell; August 4, 1886; Lima, Peru
- Died: Unknown
- Spouse: Stella Bruce Turney (m. 1911)

Andrés O'Donnell (1886–?) was an agent of the Peruvian Amazon Company of Irish–Peruvian descent, employed in the Putumayo River basin between 1903 and 1910. He managed the Entre Rios station for the Company, which collected rubber from locally enslaved indigenous populations. In 1910 Roger Casement described his plantation as "merely a center of terrorization – that is all." O'Donnell is included in three different testimonial correspondences collected in Walter Ernest Hardenburg's 'The Putumayo: The Devil's Paradise,' and at least five testimonies collected by Roger Casement in 1910. Casement's report as well as Hardenburg's book were published in 1912, and helped to expose atrocities that occurred during the Putumayo genocide. An investigation carried out by judge Carlos A. Valcárcel later managed to collect at least twenty three depositions that incriminated O'Donnell in the Putumayo genocide. O'Donnell separated from the Company in 1910, and later disappeared without a trace in the United States around New York.

== Early life ==
There is very little public information written about Andrés O'Donnell's early life. What is documented about this time, comes from Roger Casement's journal as relayed by Andrés himself. "I miss a good deal of his Spanish. He says his grandfather went to Spain from Ireland, and father came from Spain to Peru. I doubt the grandfather. It is probably further back." Andrés was born in Peru around 1886, and left "Lucia" in 1901 near the age of 17. The name "Lucia" is not specified to be a settlement or a person in Casement's journal. Sometime within the next two years O’Donnell was able to secure employment with a rubber firm operating along the Putumayo River.

== Career ==
O'Donnell began working for Julio César Arana's rubber firm sometime between 1901 and 1903. This was when he was around the age of eighteen or twenty. By 1904, O'Donnell was managing the Entre Rios station, which was located near the upper Cahuinari River. During his time in the Putumayo, he learned a Huitoto language, and became a fluent speaker in it. Near the end of his employment, Entre Rios was estimated to have a "great clearing" of between 200 and 300 acres surrounding the buildings. During his management it was stated of him, that he compelled the natives to bring in a quota of rubber, and punished them when they didn't. More often than not this punishment included flogging, or the 'cepo' which was a stockade like device. The cepo at Entre Rios contained 24 holes for the feet or legs, and was noted to be larger than the cepo at Occidente or Ultimo Retiro.

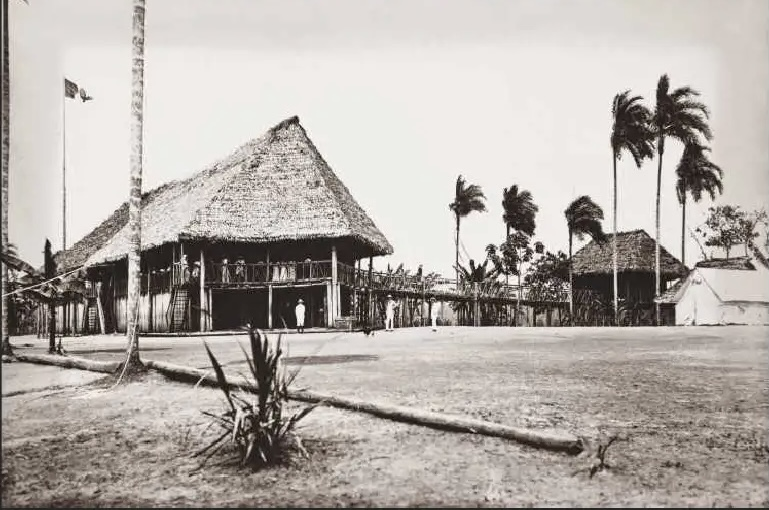
View of the Entre Rios station, circa 1912

When Andrés arrived to Entre Rios in 1903 there was an old great Native chief named Chingamuni, who still retained influence over the local Huitoto population. The manager at the time was Elías Martinengui, who only had one fabrico at the station before O'Donnell assumed management. O'Donnell mentioned that the chief was a "captain of energy and character" who was highly respected by the Huitoto's. On the way back with O'Donnell from La Chorrera after a fabrico, Chingamuni was killed during a quarrel by a Colombian named Calderon who also worked for Arana. O'Donnell stated that the Colombians were at Entre Rios and all over the Putumayo before he arrived. The Colombians "'treated' the Natives 'very badly,'" according to O'Donnell they were "much worse than he and the Peruvians... it was simply 'conquering' Indians and holding them as slaves – killing them and their women and living entirely on them." In Roger Casement's journal, he notes that this is exactly what O'Donnell and other agents of the Peruvian Amazon Company continue to do, "only with less killing."

A judicial investigation that occurred after O'Donnell's employment with the Company implicated him with the September 24, 1903 massacre of Ocaina natives at La Chorrera, ordered by Benjamin Larrañaga. This was witnessed by Emilio Mozambite and declared in his testimony. The years around 1905 are referred to as the "state of siege". Employees of the station were not allowed to bathe or wash their clothes without taking their rifle to the river and letting O'Donnell know. The "state of siege" took fruition in the Natives sending "pot shots" at the Company employee's in defiance and retaliation. According to O'Donnell he was also shot at while bathing by the river.

Early in his career O'Donnell was invited by four Andoques captains to visit their land. The captains said that they would give him rubber if he made the journey, however O'Donnell declined. Sometime after this, the Andoques and Guimaraes Natives rebelled. According to O'Donnell the Andoques threatened the Guimaraes with death if they did not help them against the whites. During this rebellion he was shot at on multiple occasions while at Entre Rios. O'Donnell never relayed to Roger Casement how the rebellion was suppressed. A map drawn in 1908 by O'Donnell depicted the "houses" of each Native tribe or "nation" around his section as well as the important paths and streams. The map had four crosses depicting where the Natives had apparently burned down "houses of the Colombians." Another area marked in red signified where he was ambushed by Natives a few miles from Entre Rios. This sketch map is still a part of the Casement Papers located at the National Library of Ireland.

According to the Entre Rios pay sheet, Andrés made 3 Peruvian soles per arobba, and 7% commission on the rubber his station collected. In 1910, O'Donnell apparently "earned" around 2000 Peruvian sols, which was around £200, every 'fabrico' from the rubber brought to Entre Rios. A 'fabrico' represented a quarter of a years worth of time, during the time of the year it was possible to harvest rubber. While O'Donnell stated he only required two fabricos per annum, and that represented around 16,000 kilos. With those numbers, that could equal a total of 33,000 kilos of rubber a year. Frederick Bishop states that was "scarcely the truth" when he was at Entre Rios last year, a fabrico came out to 24,000 kilos, and there were "nearer three than two fabricos in the year." Roger Casement estimated that if an average load for a fabrico equaled 30 kilos and brought in 16,000 kilos of rubber, this would require 5,333 natives, who were enslaved. According to Bishop "men often carry 40 or even 45 kilos down to Puerto Peruano." A journey on foot from Entre Rios to Puerto Peruano could take seven hours, and presumably longer with a heavy load of rubber. Roger Casement estimated the road from the port to Entre Rios to be between 12 and 14 miles in total, which was developed and maintained with an enormous effort from the Natives. Natives that lived further than Entre Rios of course had a longer walk, some Natives from the nearby Matanzas station had a total journey of 70 miles that had to be completed with a load of rubber. There are multiple mentions of starvation and malnourished Natives in Casement's journal on the way from Puerto Peruano to Entre Rios. O'Donnell also told Casement that when he arrived at Entire Rios in 1903 there were many more Natives, according to him a great number of them have died from small pox or other causes.

Casement noted that all the men at Entre Rios "except O'Donnell and Martin Arana, go barefooted and are dressed like 'beachcombers.' All have 'wives' and several of them children by these poor women. O'Donnell has a 'Harem' apart – a house like Velarde's in the compound." There were nine other men employed by the Company at Entre Rios, which does not account for the muchachos de confianza of the station. Casement thought the employment of this staff was a "very great waste here of the Company's money – or rather of the poor Indians money – for they supply all."

Entre Rios was the largest station owned by the Peruvian Amazon Company in its region. Other stations such as La China and Matanzas had to pass through Entre Rios on the road to Puerto Peruano. During the last fabrico of 1910 and Casement's investigation, the manager of Matanzas, Armando Normand, and his enslaved Native workers had to pass through Entre Rios to get to Puerto Peruano. O'Donnell mentioned to Casement that they "were not good friends and had not held any intercourse for six months." This conversation took place after the two witnessed Normand trying to avoid the Entre Rios road and Casement's attention. The volunteered self explanation that later came from Normand was that he was avoiding O'Donnell's crop fields since the Matanza's Natives constantly stole food from there.

Andrés O'Donnell was still working for the Peruvian Amazon Company by the time Roger Casement left the Putumayo in November 1910. Sometime over the next four months O'Donnell separated from the Company, and left the Putumayo region. In August 1911, Casement discovered Andrés was "living the life of Riley" in Barbados. Apparently Julio Arana still owed O'Donnell a decent amount of money. However he had no way of getting that money back.

== Role in the Putumayo genocide ==
During O'Donnell's management of the Entre Rios station, multiple Huitoto and Bora tribes were enslaved and induced to extract rubber for the Company. Some of these nations include the Timenses, Muitrifos, Mintofigis, Guarmaraes, Inoikoma, Muinanes, and Mimames among a number of other tribes. According to a judicial investigation, O'Donnell killed off the Native women of the Entre Rios section if they were discovered to have venereal diseases. O'Donnell, as well as other people told Casement about several cases of the Native "captains" who were boys. Some of these young boys were around the age of fifteen and came to inherit the hereditary role when the previous captain was killed.

Depositions that were collected by Hardenburg relating to O'Donnell include Daniel Collantes; Marcial Gorries; and Juan Rosas. Daniel Collantes gave a long testimony of crimes in the Putumayo, and mentioned O'Donnell in passing regarding an incident that happened with Elias Martinengui. In the conclusion of Collantes statement, Daniel gives a list of names he refers to as diabolical criminals including Andrés O'Donnell and other managers who worked for Arana. Marcial Gorries wrote a letter to Benjamin Saldaña Rocca, which was published by La Felpa on January 5 and 12, 1908. The letter stated the "principal criminals" are the Chiefs of Sections, and lists of names including Armando Normand; José Inocente Fonseca, Augusto Jiménez Seminario, Andrés O'Donnell and six others. Marcial continued "With the exception of O'Donnell who has not killed Indians with his own hands, but has ordered over 500 Indians to be killed, all the rest – every one of them – have killed with their own hands." In Juan Rosas deposition, he states that O'Donnell induces the Natives to deliver a quota of rubber to him, and when they do not "he submits them to most cruel punishments, mutilating them and then ending by murdering them."

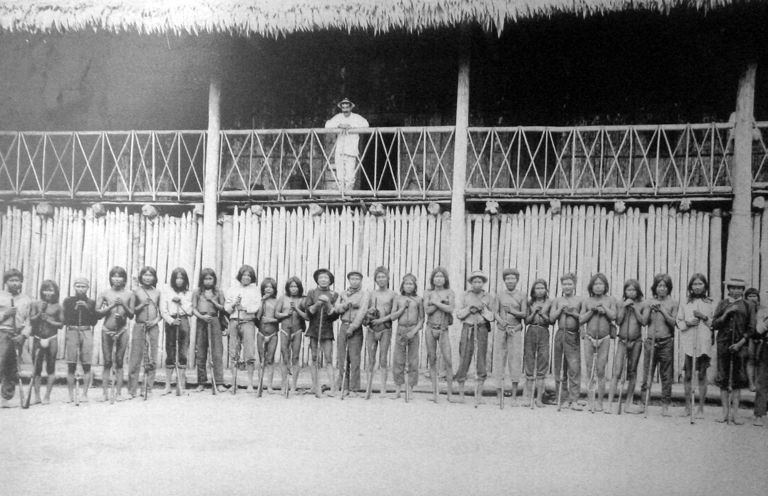
Racionale standing above his indigenous workers at Entre Rios, a rubber plantation of the Peruvian Amazon Company

An investigatory commission was sent by the Peruvian Amazon Company in 1910, which the British Foreign office attached Roger Casement to learn about the treatment of Barbadians in the Putumayo. They travelled through Puerto Peruano to Entre Rios in October. The Barbadians who made depositions to Roger Casement and mentioned their time working for Andrés O'Donnell include Frederick Bishop, James Chase, Allan Davis, Joseph Minggs, Augustus Walcott, and Sidney Morris.

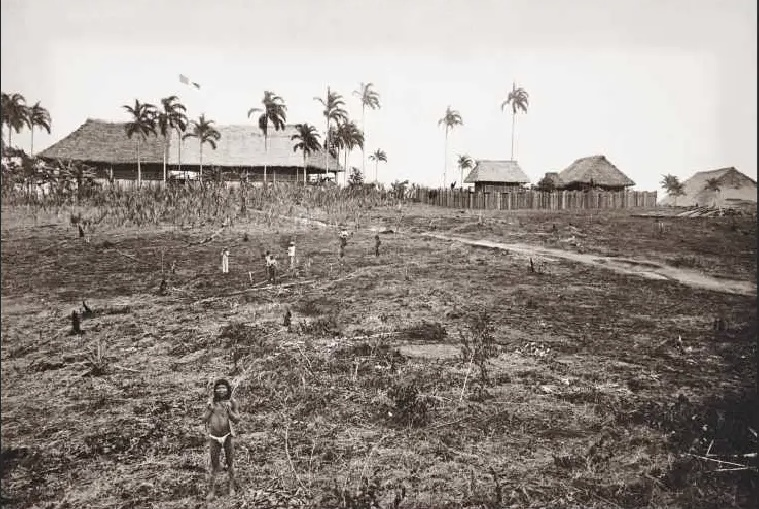
"The Entre Ríos station is located in the center of a huge clearing of more than 900,000 m2"

Bishop spent over a year at Entre Rios under O'Donnell's management sometime between the end of 1908 or start of 1908 until January 1910. Bishop stated that while he didn't see O'Donnell murder anyone, or see any natives killed at Entre Rios the floggings occurred "just the same as elsewhere" in the Putumayo. Bishop heard O'Donnell send out his muchachos de Confinzas to kill natives in the forest "if rubber was not forthcoming," however he has no knowledge about those individual actions. In his deposition, James Chase testified that he witnessed a murder that was ordered by O'Donnell in 1907. A Native came before O'Donnell, seemingly voluntarily, and in the middle of conversation a muchacho de confianza walked away, grabbed a shotgun and then shot the native in his face, in front of the whole station. While Chase didn't see O'Donnell flog any natives during his time at Entre Rios, he saw many floggings carried out by O'Donnell's orders.

Allan Davis worked at Entre Rios for two years, between 1905 and 1907. Davis was primarily employed at this station on "commissions" and to make sure the Natives were gathering rubber. He stated that if the Natives did not meet the weight quota for rubber, they were flogged at there homes and later at the station for the same reason. At times, Davis flogged the Natives himself, with the exception of women, which indeed were flogged at the station, as well as children at times. In his testimony, Davis declared that he witnessed two murders at the station. The two Natives had run away, and they were later executed by O'Donnell's 'muchachos de confianza' when they got caught. Joseph Minggs worked at Entre Rios for O'Donnell for around three months in 1909, where Augustus Walcott, Basilio Cama and Minggs were employed to flogged the Natives. Minggs was also sent out on "commissions" to hunt down and enslave the Natives. According to him, only women were flogged by O'Donnell "with a small whip." Minggs stated that he did not give more than five or six lashes to men and two lashes towards small children. When Casement asked how the Natives received such terrible scars from the floggings and who did it to them, he blamed Frederick Bishop as well as Basilio Cama. Minggs was dismissed from Entre Rios after a few natives escaped from his supervision. Augustus Walcott worked for O'Donnell at Entre Rios for around eight months in 1910, where he was employed to flog the Natives. Sidney Morris worked at Entre Rios for around four months where he was sent out on "commissions" at times, and according to him he saw Natives flogged, but did not flog any himself.

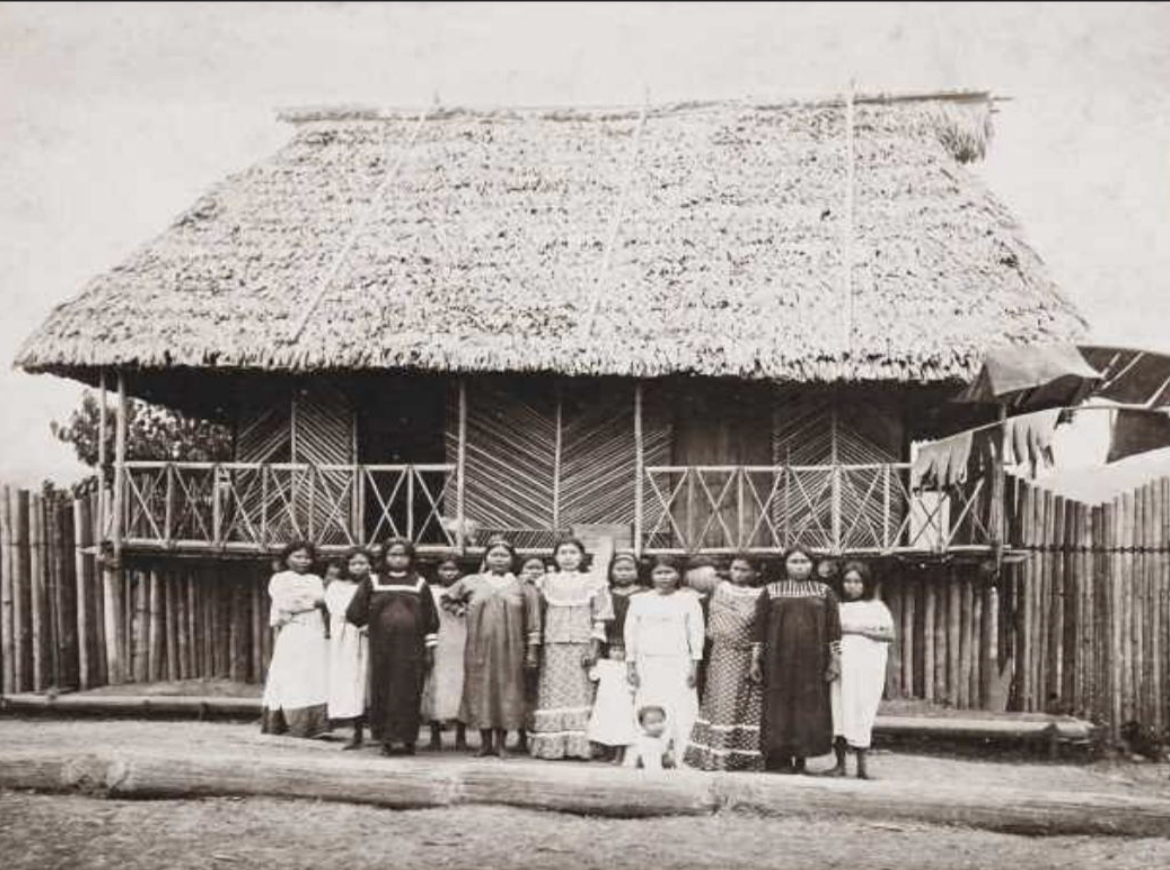
Harem of concubines belonging to Andres O'Donnell, photograph taken by Silvino Santos in 1912

Judge Valcárcel arrived in the Putumayo in 1911, a year after Roger Casement's commission to the region. During his investigation in the region, the judge compiled a report of more than 3,000 pages including criminal evidence, photographs, and testimonies. At least twenty-three testimonies collected by Valcárcel revealed crimes personally committed or ordered by Andrés O'Donnell. According to Judge Valcárcel's investigatory report, while laying in his hammock, O'Donnell shot around 40 natives, men and women who were placed in a row in front of him. O'Donnell also murdered the Native captain Papaire, because Andrés wanted the captains wife, Rosaura Witoto. There were multiple witnesses to this killing, including Santiago de Calle, who also declared that O'Donnell wanted to employ him as an executioner, Santiago also witnessed the killing of Salvador. Rosaura Witoto later testified to Valcárcel, and said she did not know who killed her husband because she was not there when the murder happened, but shortly after O'Donnell made Rosaura his mistress. Rosaura stated that she had a daughter with Andres, named Teresa O'Donnell who was in Lima at the time of her deposition. In 1910, Casement noted there were three O'Donnell children, all with different mothers. O'Donnell ordered the execution of the Native woman Sofia, because she was unfaithful to her husband Frederick Bishop. According to Valcárcel she was hanged as well as whipped by O'Donnell and Bishop until she died. Charuya Muinane was a witness to this killing. Bishop whipped her so bad that the testimony stated her back was torn to pieces. Sofia's body was buried by Bishop on O'Donnell's orders.

There were multiple witnesses to the killing of captain Papaire, including Nicolas Witoto. O'Donnell threatened Nicolas that if he testified later, upon his return O'Donnell would "punish him severely." Nicolas Witoto was likely a muchacho de Confianza of O'Donnell, as another testimony from Niray Boras, stated that O'Donnell ordered Nicolas to execute Niray's father. Nicolas and three other Natives helped the judge Valcárcel discover the burial site of Sofia, Papaire and Salvador, who were either murdered by O'Donnell or ordered to be executed by him. Another burial site from a victim of O'Donnell was discovered shortly after, containing the remains of the Native named Ruitoque. Medical opinions and further contents from this investigation were later published by Valcárcel.

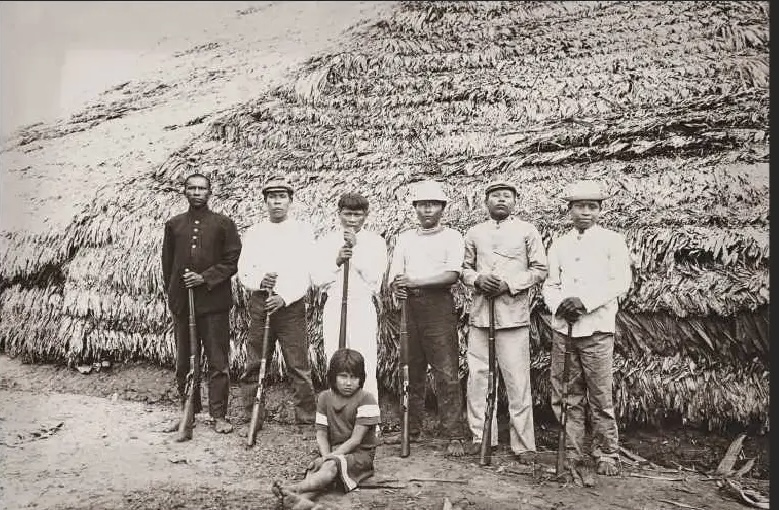
Muchachos de Confianza at Entre Rios, circa 1912

In their testimony, multiple people reported O'Donnell threatened to return and punish the staff or the Natives if they later testified. Despite these threats judge Valcárcel was still able to secure multiple testimonies from the Natives. The Company employee Froilán Patiño testified to Valcárcel that he witnessed O'Donnell commit numerous crimes against the Natives around the Entre Rios and Sabana stations. Patiño recalled one raid where O'Donnell ordered the deaths of 15 Native men, and Andrés joined in the shooting himself. On the way back to Entre Rios from the raid, Patiño also witnessed the murder of another Native, who was shot five times by O'Donnell's revolver. A Native named Eduardo Ocaina declared to Valcarcel that he witnessed O'Donnell murder two natives named Caricoma and Ditiama. Quimedire Witoto reported that he saw O'Donnell personally kill four Natives from the Timenses Nation who were not bringing in rubber, and he flogged many others.

== Later life and disappearance ==
On August 28, 1911, Casement was surprised to be greeted by Andrés O'Donnell at the port in Bridgetown and discover that he was living in Barbados. O'Donnell apparently looked "abjectly miserable" at the time, as he was owed "quite a bit of money" by Julio Arana. Shortly after their meeting, Casement wrote to Gerald Spicer of the British Foreign Office, telling Spicer to inform the Peruvian government that Andrés was living in Barbados and they should take steps to extradite him. In his letter to Spicer, Casement wrote "I don't think he [O'Donnell] killed Indians for pleasure or sport – but only to terrorize for rubber – a thing he was appointed to do by his superiors." Casement also wrote the following regarding O'Donnell "he had a very well kept and well planted station and his Indians seemed happier than any others I met..." however, he continues "it was just the same infamous regime of extortion and terrorism there as elsewhere."

When Roger Casement arrived at Bridgetown in Barbados on December 29, 1911, he found out that O'Donnell was still living in the island as a free man. Two days earlier, on December 29 O'Donnell had married Stella Bruce Turney. Stella was the daughter a local British dignitary, the superintendent of Queen's park. Casement noted that a "strong contingent of the local Peruvian 'colony'" and a number of British residents attended the wedding celebration. More than one of those Peruvians were murderers that worked in the Putumayo region. The marriage was referred to by the local news press as one of the "fashionable events" occurring that week.

O'Donnell was arrested in Barbados, but was later released on a legal technicality relating to extradition. The papers sent by the Government of Peru did not meet the legal requirements of "Article XII." Sir Hildred Carlile inquired into the reasoning for that oversight, and expressed to the Peruvian government "his hopes" that they would take steps to extradite O'Donnell from whatever country he sought asylum in. After the chief of justice in Barbados ordered his release, O'Donnell took the first available ship at the Bridgetown wharf and escaped to Panama. O'Donnell managed to arrange transportation to the United States, and disappeared in New York shortly after.

When the American consul Stuart J. Fuller and British consul George Mitchell travelled to investigate conditions in the Putumayo in 1912, they travelled with Marcial Zumaeta on the Liberal steamship. Marcial was returning from Barbados with a Huitoto woman named Julia, who was reported to be an Indigenous mistress that once “belonged” to Andres O'Donnell. An album published by the Peruvian Amazon Company in 1912 contains a photograph from the Entre Rios section titled "The Indian Huitota Julia sewing by machine." This is presumably the same Julia who was a concubine of O'Donnell. The photograph was used by Carlos Rey de Castro and in extension the Peruvian Amazon Company in an attempt to portray the Company as a civilizing force in the Amazon.

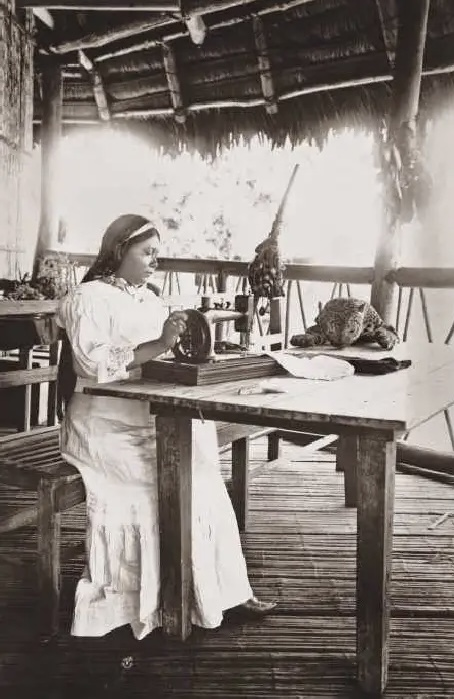
Photograph used as propaganda by the Peruvian Amazon Company. The photograph's title is: "The Indian Huitota Julia sewing by machine."

== See also ==
- Armando Normand
- Julio César Arana
- List of fugitives from justice who disappeared
- Roger Casement
- Peruvian Amazon Company
- Putumayo genocide

== Sources ==
- Casement, Roger (1997). The Amazon Journal of Roger Casement. Anaconda editions. ISBN 1901990052.
- Hardenburg, Walter (1912). The Putumayo, the Devil's Paradise; Travels in the Peruvian Amazon Region and an Account of the Atrocities Committed Upon the Indians Therein. London: Fischer Unwin. ISBN 1372293019.
- Valcárcel, Carlos (2004). El proceso del Putumayo y sus secretos inauditos. The International Work Group for Indigenous Affairs.
- Chirif, Alberto (2009). Imaginario e imágenes de la época del caucho: Los sucesos del Putumayo. The International Work Group for Indigenous Affairs.
- Goodman, Jordan (2010). The Devil and Mr. Casement: One Man's Battle for Human Rights in South America's Heart of Darkness. Farrar, Straus and Giroux. ISBN 978-1429936392.
