= Arano =

Arano may refer to:

- Arano, Buenos Aires, a ghost town in central Argentina
- Arano, Navarre, a village in northern Spain
- Arano (surname), a Spanish language surnarme

== See also ==
- Aranos, a town in the Hardap Region of Namibia
- Arana
