= Liberal (steamship) =

British-built Peruvian iron steamship

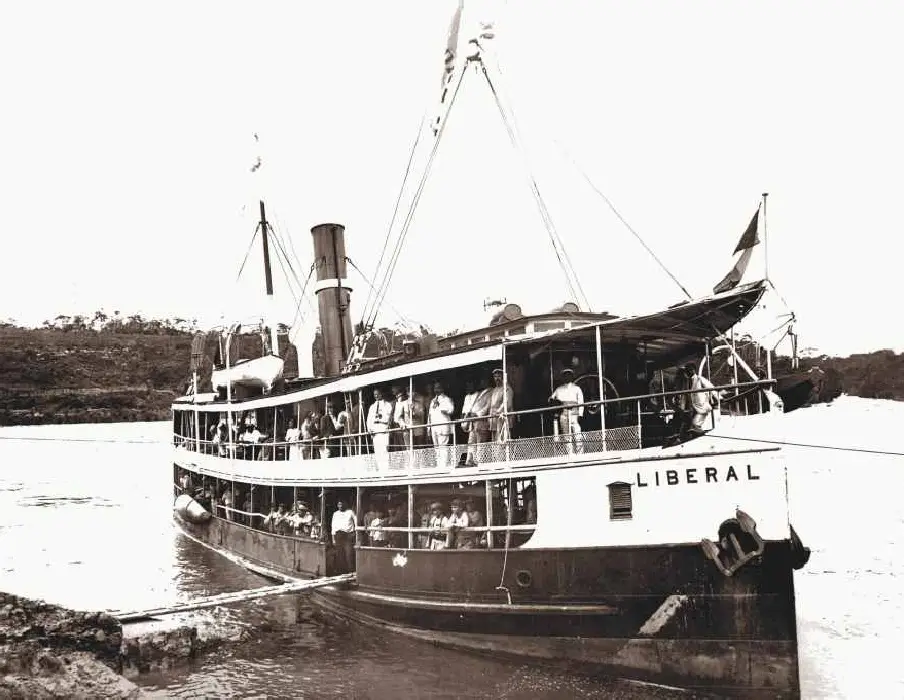
- Liberal at La Chorrera in 1912

History

Peru
- Ordered: 1904
- Builder: Murdoch & Murray
- Launched: September 23, 1904
- Completed: October 1904
- Status: Unknown

General characteristics
- Tonnage: 148 grt / 101 nrt
- Length: 105 ft (32 m)
- Propulsion: screw

Liberal was a screw steamship commissioned by J.C. Arana y Hermanos and built in 1904. The vessel transported rubber for Julio César Arana's enterprise, which became the Peruvian Amazon Company in 1907. (Note: Liberal was described as the "flagship of the Peruvian Amazon Company" in the Amazon Journal of Roger Casement.)

The ship played a significant role in the Peruvian Amazon Company's expeditions against the Colombian settlements of La Unión and La Reserva at the beginning of 1908. Liberal was mortgaged to Eleanora Zumaeta de Arana on May 5, 1911, prior to the liquidation of the Peruvian Amazon Company.

== History ==
The Liberal steamship was built by Murdoch & Murray at yard number 199 in Port Glasgow in October 1904. It was commissioned by J.C. Arana y Hermanos, a rubber firm with offices in the cities of Manaus and Iquitos, located along the Amazon River. Liberal first arrived in Iquitos in December 1904. The vessel regularly operated between Iquitos and the Putumayo River, transporting rubber and personnel for Arana's enterprise.

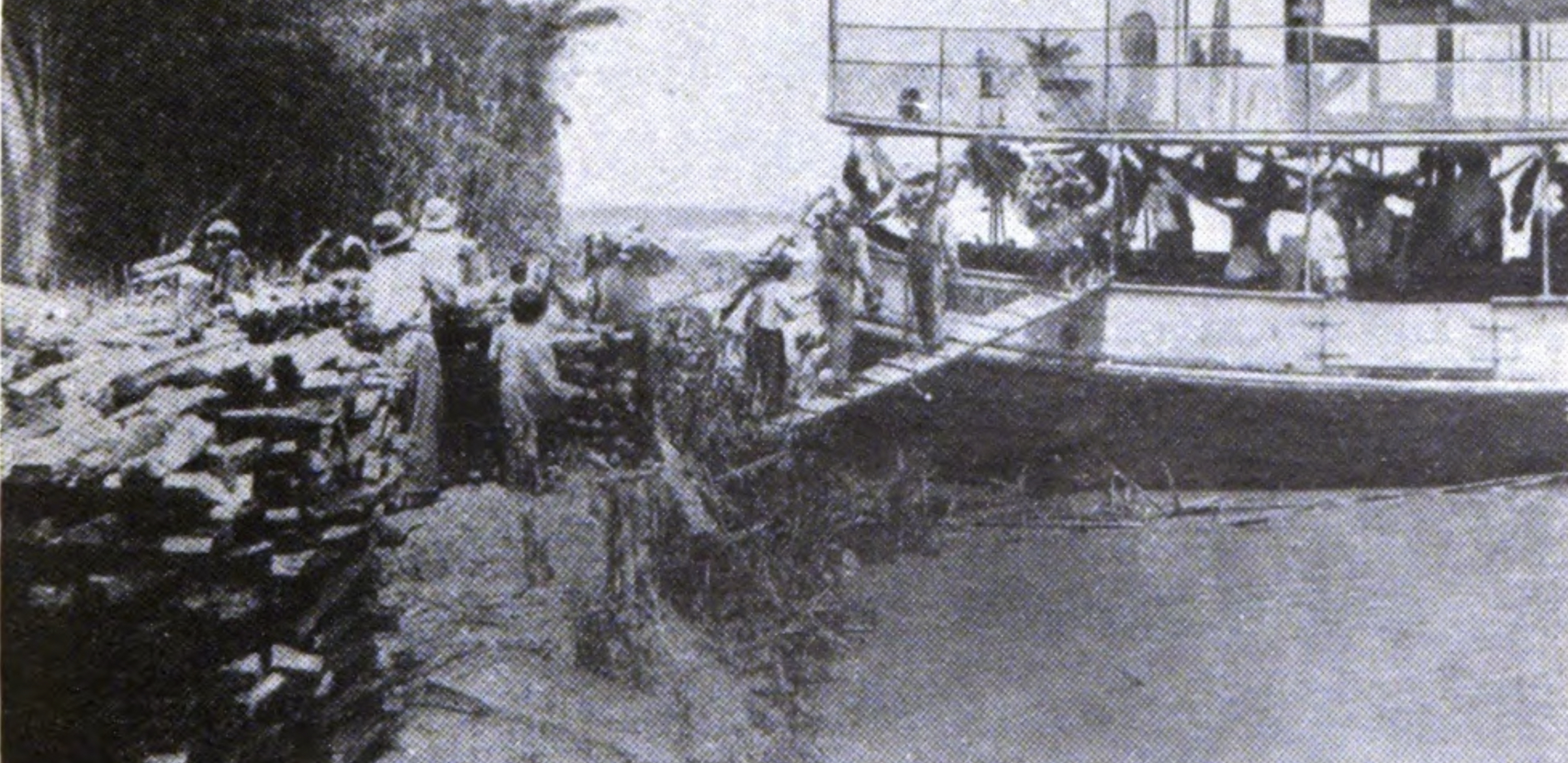
Liberal embarking rubber for the Peruvian Amazon Company

Liberal also transported Peruvian soldiers from Iquitos to the Putumayo on several occasions. (Note: The steamship Cosmopolita, also owned by Arana's company, transported Peruvian soldiers to the Putumayo as well.) According to David Cazes, the British consul-general in Iquitos between 1903 and 1910, Arana's company transported Peruvian military personnel and their supplies from Iquitos to the Putumayo without charge. In return, the Peruvian government did not levy duties on the company's rubber shipments. (Note: Casement noted that "not only was this the case, but the detachments there were lodged and fed very largely at the Company's expense.") In 1905, Liberal completed three voyages between Iquitos and the Putumayo estates, arriving in Iquitos in May, September, and November of that year.

Following Armando Normand's attack on Urbano Gutiérrez in January 1907, eight Colombians were taken captive aboard Liberal by employees of Arana's company, who intended to send them to prison in Iquitos. However, they were later abandoned in a canoe near Cotuhé to prevent Brazilian officials from discovering them upon arrival at port.

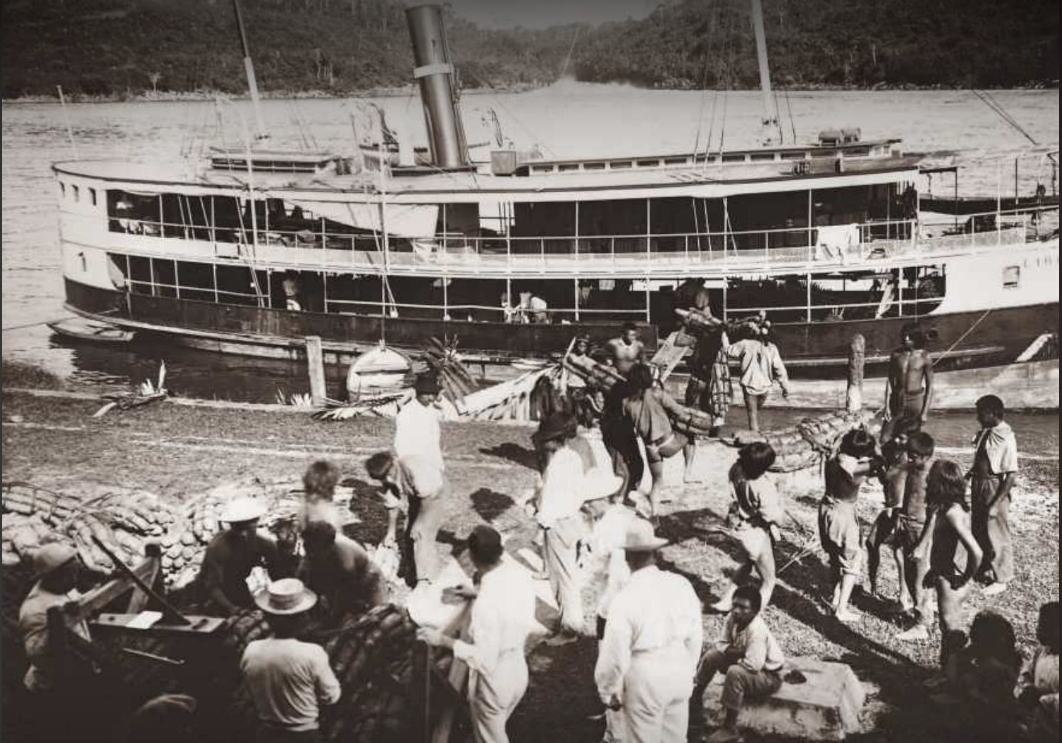
The Liberal steamship

On August 5, 1907, Iquitos-based journalist Benjamín Saldaña Roca published "La ola de sangre" ("The Wave of Blood"), detailing an incident aboard Liberal witnessed by a cook named Juan Vela. According to Vela, upon hearing a commotion, he saw Captain Zubiaur beating an employee of Arana's company, Juan Juárez, with a large piece of firewood. Zubiaur then dragged Juárez below deck, where "six sailors, at Zubiaur's orders, gave him still more blows, mutilating and destroying his whole body." Afterwards, Juárez was thrown onto the riverbank and abandoned, and he reportedly shot himself two days later due to his injuries.

On September 23, 1907, Saldaña Roca published another article stating: "The Liberal, small steamer of the Casa Arana, has brought from the Putumayo 93,000 kilos of elastic rubber. How many whippings, mutilations, tortures, tears, blood, murders and desolations represent such rubber!" (Note: "El Liberal, vaporcito de la Casa Arana, ha traído del Putumayo 93,000 kilos de goma elástica. ¡¡¡Cuántos latigazos, mutilaciones, torturas, lágrimas, sangre, asesinatos y desolaciones representará la tal goma!!!")

According to Charles C. Eberhardt, the American consul-general in Iquitos in 1907, upon its return to Iquitos on November 15 that year, Liberal reported that 100 Colombian soldiers were encamped across the river from La Chorrera.

In December 1907, Miguel S. Loayza reportedly sent several subordinates to harass David Serrano in an effort to pressure him to abandon his estate. Serrano’s wife, child, and merchandise were loaded onto Liberal after he was tied to a tree and forced to watch as his wife was assaulted. (Note: Hardenburg wrote that Loayza used Serrano's debt as justification for the harassment.) This incident occurred approximately one month before the assault on Serrano's estate.

=== Attacks on La Unión and La Reserva ===
Liberal completed a voyage to El Encanto on January 3, 1908, carrying 85 soldiers from the Peruvian garrison at Iquitos. (Note: The source states that Liberal arrived five days after the "war warning," presumably the message sent by Loayza to Iquitos.) Around this time, Colombian police inspector Jesús Orejuela was waiting at Argelia for a meeting with Loayza; however, Loayza did not arrive, and Orejuela was detained. The raids on La Unión and La Reserva began shortly after Orejuela's imprisonment. He was brought aboard Liberal at around 9 a.m. on January 13 and confined in what Hardenburg described as a "little cage." (Note: Orejuela was later transported on the ship to Iquitos, where the city's prefect ordered his release.)

In January 1908, armed employees of Arana's company aboard Liberal, together with the Peruvian warship Iquitos, which carried approximately 85 Peruvian soldiers, attacked a Colombian rubber station named La Unión. Carlos Zubiaur was captain of Liberal during the raids on La Unión and La Reserva, which took place on January 12. The armed agents of Arana's enterprise aboard Liberal were led by Miguel S. Loayza, Bartolomé Zumaeta, and Miguel Flores.

On February 1, 1908, Benjamín Saldaña Roca published an article in La Sanción titled "The Crime of Lesa Patria." The article claimed that Loayza had telegraphed company headquarters—"either through being misinformed, or as is more probable, maliciously"—that "a large force of Colombians, well armed and uniformed and under the command of two generals," was assembling to attack El Encanto and La Chorrera. This supposed force was said to consist of 300 to 400 men with a cannon. In response, 85 Peruvian soldiers from the Iquitos garrison were dispatched to the Putumayo after the Peruvian Amazon Company forwarded Loayza's message to the prefect in Iquitos. (Note: In 1910, Víctor Macedo told Roger Casement that 120 Peruvian soldiers were sent to respond to what was later understood to be a fictitious threat of a Colombian invasion. Macedo stated that 80 of these soldiers perished, mostly near El Encanto.)

Bartolomé Zumaeta, accompanied by 14 Peruvian soldiers, travelled along the Yubineto River aboard the Callao steamship, capturing several Colombians, including Gabriel Martínez, (Note: Sources vary on the date of this incident, giving December 13 or 14.) manager of the Ordoñez y Martínez Rubber Company, because he "had dealings with Indians, whom the Aranas cynically said belonged to them." In retaliation, Colombian authorities imprisoned two agents of Arana's company who had been sent to trade at La Unión. Loayza, accompanied by around 80 armed men employed by Arana’s company, embarked on Liberal to investigate the incident. Liberal was joined by Iquitos, which carried Peruvian soldiers and artillery. The Peruvians reportedly used six cannons and two machine guns during the attack. (Note: Hardenburg wrote that he believed he heard gunfire from a Gatling gun on Iquitos, though he did not confirm hearing cannon fire.) (Note: "You know that eighty guns went up on the Liberal early in 1908, and you know eighty guns could not go up there without 2,000 or 3,000 cartridges.")

At La Unión, Colombian colonel Gustavo Prieto reportedly unfurled the Colombian flag in response to repeated Peruvian demands to land, which, according to Hardenburg and Saldaña Roca, triggered the conflict between the two groups. After resisting for about half an hour, the Colombians ran out of ammunition and fled into the jungle. The Peruvians seized roughly one thousand arrobas of rubber and took several Colombian women captive. Five Colombians were killed at La Unión, and more than 27 were reported killed between La Unión and La Reserva. The dwellings at La Unión were set on fire, and cattle, machinery, and other valuable goods were sent to Iquitos. According to Liberal pilot Simón Pisango, gunfire was first opened from Liberal, and Loayza was on board at the time. (Note: Pisango later wrote a letter to the newspaper Loreto Comercial implicating "grave charges against Reigada.")

Former Arana Company employee Julio Montero gave a sworn deposition in Iquitos in 1909, stating that 29 Colombians were taken prisoner during the raid on La Reserva, including prominent patrons David Serrano and Ildefonso González. (Note: Montero provided the names of 15 prisoners, including David Serrano and Ildefonso González, who were key figures in the region.) According to Montero's account, the captives "who had already been robbed and were then in chains, were taken out of the house and not far off were shot to death and cut to pieces with machetes." (Note: A Peruvian ex-sergeant reportedly protested the killings, after which Bartolomé Zumaeta ordered his execution.) This information was corroborated by Colombian eyewitness Carlos Murgaitio, who published his own account in the Jornal de Comércio of Manaus.

Hardenburg reported seeing both Liberal and Iquitos travelling toward La Unión and later returning with prisoners, though he did not witness the attack itself. While those aboard Liberal ignored his canoe, men on Iquitos fired upon his group and captured them. Hardenburg later wrote that Montero's deposition had described the same events he had heard about from others.

Several hours after the raids on La Unión and La Reserva, Iquitos and Liberal reached Argelia, where they stayed overnight. Hardenburg was transferred from Iquitos to Liberal at this point and reunited with his companion Walter Perkins, who was already imprisoned. Hardenburg and Orejuela learned that the raid on La Reserva had resulted in the looting of 170 arrobas of rubber, which were loaded onto Liberal, while the settlement was "destroyed [after] everything they could not steal." (Note: Orejuela later provided his own testimony on this event, which appeared in Las Crueldades.)

On January 13, Liberal and Iquitos continued down the Caraparana River toward El Encanto, reaching a Colombian rubber station named El Dorado around 9:30 a.m. (Note: According to Hardenburg and Abelardo Calderón, El Dorado was located five to six hours by steamship from El Encanto.) Hardenburg wrote that Loayza threatened the Colombians with death if they did not abandon their estate and surrender their firearms. Loayza's men seized the weapons and returned to the steamships before proceeding toward El Encanto. El Dorado was owned by Colombian Ildefonso González, who was later killed by Arana's manager Mariano Olañete while relocating his workforce.

Hardenburg persuaded Loayza that the disappearance of either himself or Perkins would draw the attention of the United States government. Loayza later agreed to grant them passage on Liberal to Iquitos; however, Captain Zubiaur demanded a payment of £17 for their transport.

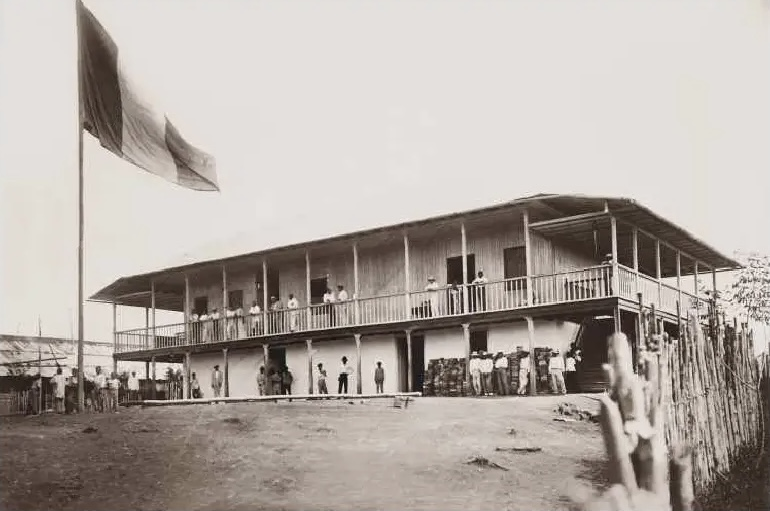
The main house at El Encanto, belonging to Miguel S. Loayza

The steamship Cosmopolita stopped at Chorrera while Liberal was engaged in the expedition against Colombian settlements. On January 19, 1908, Cosmopolita travelled to the port of Santa Julia, where it met Liberal. On January 20, both vessels joined Iquitos at a settlement named Arica, near the confluence of the Igaraparana tributary with the Putumayo River. The three ships travelled together toward the Peruvian border with Brazil, with Iquitos escorting the others until reaching the confluence of the Cotuhé and the Putumayo. Cosmopolita and Liberal then continued to Iquitos, while Iquitos remained at Cotuhé. Liberal arrived at Iquitos on either January 31 or February 1, according to Hardenburg, carrying 35,000 kilos of rubber and seven Colombian prisoners "suffering heavily" from imprisonment conditions. The rubber was collected from El Encanto and from Colombian settlements raided by the Peruvian Amazon Company. Cosmopolita transported 120,000 kilos of rubber on the same voyage.

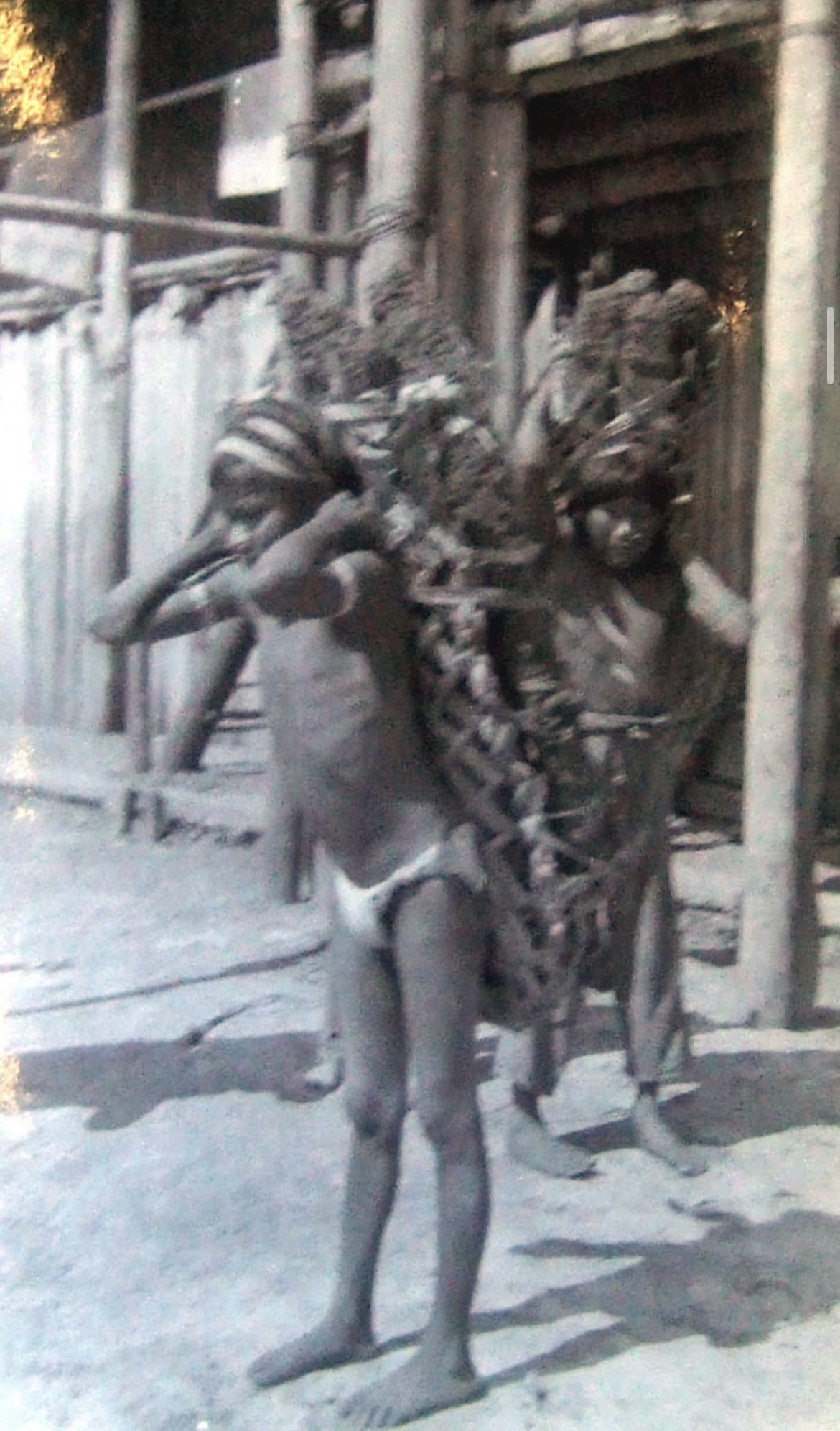
An Indigenous youth carrying a load of rubber in the Putumayo

"Another method of exploiting these unfortunate Indians takes the form of selling them as slaves in Iquitos, and this business in human flesh yields excellent returns to the company or its employees, for they are sold in that capital at from £20 to £40 each. Every steamer that goes to Iquitos, loaded with the rubber from the Putumayo, carries from five to fifteen little Indian boys and girls, who are torn, sobbing, from their mothers' arms without the slightest compunction. These little innocents, as we have already said, are sold at wholesale and retail by this 'civilising company' in Iquitos, the capital of the Department of Loreto."

— Walter Ernest Hardenburg, The Putumayo: The Devil's Paradise

Many of the Peruvian Amazon Company employees involved in the attacks on La Unión were later arrested, with the notable exception of Bartolomé Zumaeta. They were taken to La Chorrera in chains and imprisoned for about two months before the prefect of Iquitos, along with Julio César Arana and Peruvian consul-general Carlos Rey de Castro, arrived. Roger Casement remarked that "[t]his journey of Señor Arana in company with these two Peruvian officers of high rank is really the key to the whole subsequent situation." The prefect, Carlos Zapata, ordered the group's release. Casement, David Cazes, and other sources alleged that Arana bribed Zapata with between £5,000 and £8,000 to secure their freedom. During Casement's 1910 investigation of the Peruvian Amazon Company, he discovered that Rey de Castro was indebted to Arana's firm in Manaus for between £4,000 and £5,000.

=== 1909–1911 ===
In 1910, British consul-general Roger Casement was sent to investigate the treatment and involvement of Barbadian employees working for Julio César Arana's rubber enterprise. Casement travelled to the Putumayo River estates aboard the Liberal. Elías Martinengui, who managed a Peruvian Amazon Company station, later departed the Putumayo aboard the same vessel, accompanied by four of his Indigenous concubines from Atenas. Martinengui left on the Liberal following Casement's journey from Iquitos to the Putumayo.

The Indigenous labourers subjugated by Arana's company were required to transport rubber from local stations to La Chorrera and El Encanto, from where it was shipped down the Putumayo River towards Iquitos via the Igaraparana and Caraparana tributaries. (Note: Some Indigenous families had to travel between 50 and 60 miles, depending on the station to which they were assigned.)

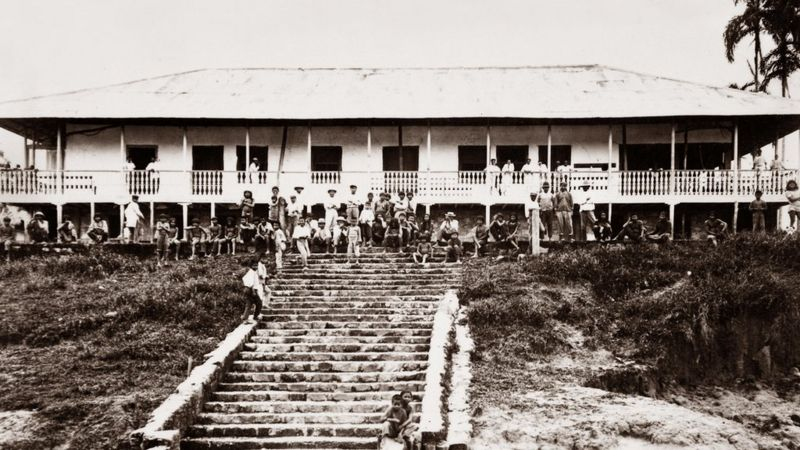
The Peruvian Amazon Company regional headquarters at La Chorrera

Describing the transportation of rubber from Entre Ríos to La Chorrera, Casement wrote:

"The fifty men who go down to Chorrera have to carry the whole of this mass of rubber from [Puerto] Victoria, about 1½ miles above the rapid down to Chorrera—a distance of probably three miles... When the rubber is unloaded and stored he will be kept at Chorrera doing any dirty or heavy work at the Station, just as the Boras Indians who found on arrival had to discharge the cargo from the 'Liberal'."

— Roger Casement, The Amazon Journal of Roger Casement

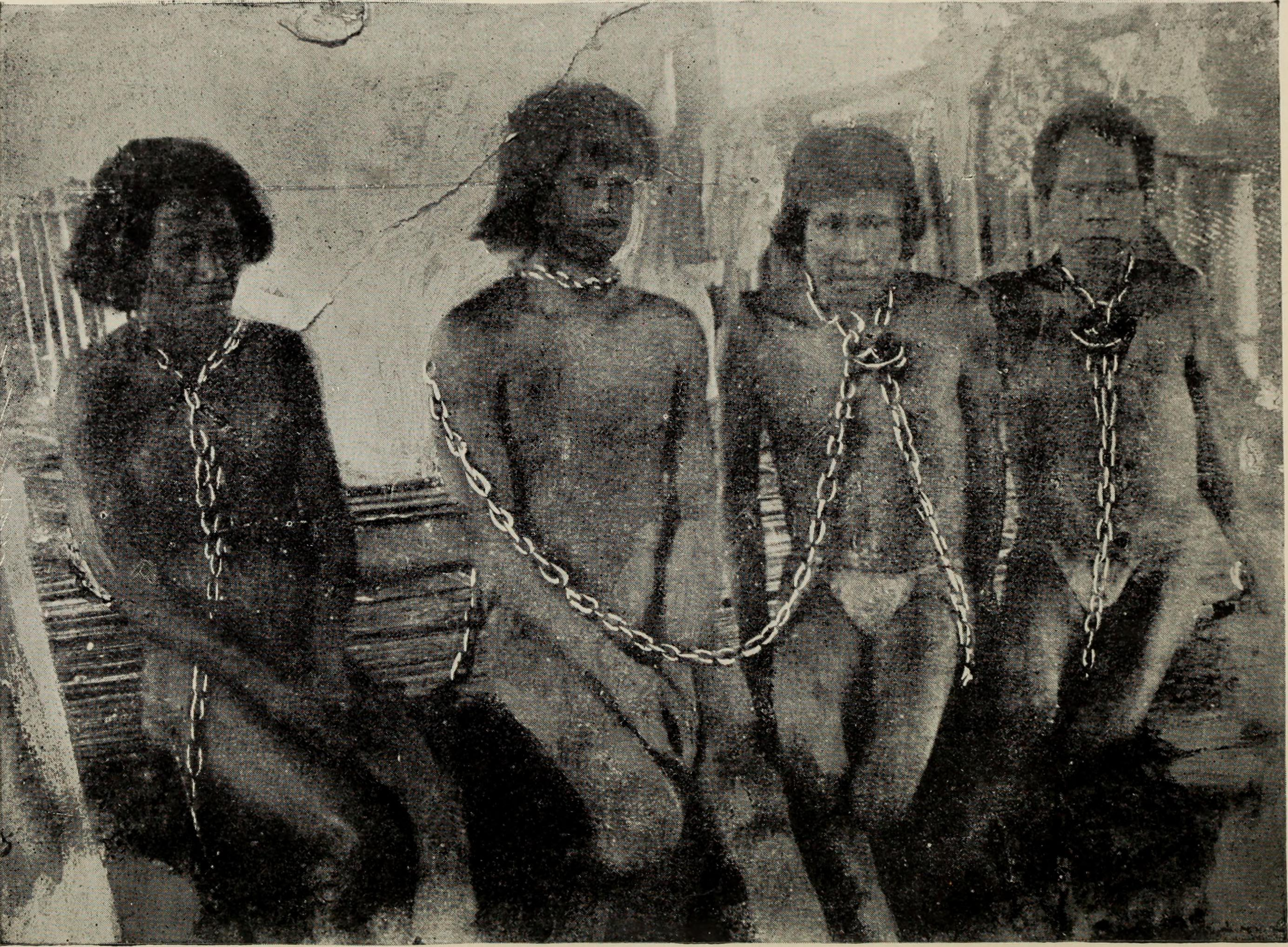
Natives imprisoned by the Peruvian Amazon Company, photograph first published in 1912

On August 26, 1910, Casement was informed by the Brazilian customs post at Javari that the Liberal had cleared the Javari River carrying 45 tons of rubber and "many sick men", mostly Peruvian soldiers. He estimated the shipment's value at approximately £45,000. On September 1, the Liberal arrived at Iquitos with 23 ill soldiers and its cargo of rubber.

Casement interviewed Stanley Lewis aboard the Liberal on September 20, and James Clark on September 22. Lewis, employed as a steward, provided details of abuse, while Clark, who worked aboard other company vessels, did not report witnessing any mistreatment. The Liberal arrived at La Chorrera on September 23 with Casement and the commercial commission. The Boras men seen unloading its cargo were later sent to El Encanto with Miguel Flores, under whose authority they worked.

Frederick Bishop informed Casement that Captain Zubiaur had once confined a Peruvian man in the ship's hold, where he died from suffocation. Casement wrote that "nothing was done to Zubiaur," adding that "anyone would die from even half an hour down the hold of a tiny launch like this." Casement also recorded that Captain Reigada had employed the same punishment against crew members who became intoxicated on the Liberal.

By November 12, 1910, Casement recorded rubber deliveries for the fabrico season as follows:

- Sur Section: 8 tons
- Occidente: (Note: In 1910, Casement was told that Occidente yielded around 50 tons of rubber annually.)
- Atenas: (Note: The manager of Atenas in 1910 told Casement that the station produced around 24 tons annually.)
- Entre Ríos: 14 tons
- Andokes: 8 tons
- Oriente: not specified

He noted that the stations of Último Retiro and Santa Catalina were expected to deliver rubber prior to the Liberal's departure, while Sabana and Abisinia were expected to do so in December.

On November 12, Casement observed around 40–50 Indigenous labourers from the Sur station loading rubber onto the Liberal, along with several from Entre Ríos. During repairs to the vessel's screw shaft, a worker from Sur was assaulted by an employee from Entre Ríos named Borborini, who was subsequently dismissed. Borborini planned to depart on the next voyage of the Liberal, but instead travelled to retrieve his wives from Entre Ríos and was expected to rejoin the ship later. (Note: Frederick Bishop told Casement that Borborini had murdered at least two Indigenous people at a station named Urania. Natives at Puerto Peruano described him as the "principal flogger" at Entre Ríos.)

Casement and several Barbadian workers boarded the Liberal on November 16, 1910, departing La Chorrera for Iquitos. The ship carried "sixty-odd tons of rubber." On November 21, 15 Barbadians disembarked at a Brazilian port. The Liberal's chief engineer told Casement that annual operating costs for the vessel were between £6,000 and £7,000.

Casement later noted an article in El Oriente of Iquitos reporting frequent abductions of Indigenous children, implicating Captains Reigada and Zubiaur—both former captains of the Liberal—in the practice.

On December 14, 1910, Pablo Zumaeta travelled to the Putumayo aboard the Liberal "to replace incapable employees," accompanied by Benjamin Dublé. (Note: Dublé was an ally of Arana's company and supported Zumaeta's 1911 mayoral campaign in Iquitos.)

In February 1911, Víctor Macedo, Andrés O'Donnell, and the Commercial Commission travelled aboard the Liberal away from the Putumayo. Judge Rómulo Paredes reported that the arrival of Casement and later of himself in the region prompted several company employees implicated in atrocities to flee. He stated that the Liberal's crew confirmed that two managers, Abelardo Agüero and Augusto Jiménez Seminario, had recently departed the area aboard the vessel to avoid discovery.

In 1911, the Liberal was mortgaged to Eleanora Zumaeta de Arana along with other assets of the Peruvian Amazon Company, amounting to £60,000. The mortgage was dated May 5, 1911, and signed by Pablo Zumaeta, director of the company. The Liberal continued transporting rubber from Arana's Putumayo estates under the firm of Cecilio Hernández.

The Liberal arrived in Iquitos on November 27, 1911, with 25 tons of rubber consigned by agents of Hernández's firm on behalf of Eleanora Zumaeta. Casement was informed by Siefert Greenidge that Donald Francis had been aboard during its return voyage and was assisted by Captain Ubaldo Lores to disembark in Brazil, avoiding Peruvian authorities. (Note: Greenidge stated: "He tells me that Donald Francis came down by the Liberal & stayed in Brazil – helped by the Captain Ubaldo Lores who 'likes him', to get off and away.")

On August 29, 1912, Colombian consul-general José Torralbo described the Liberal as "a veritable phantom ship, the whistle of which raises terror in the inhabitants of the forests," and alleged that "[Bartolomé] Zumaeta and many of his companions have committed acts of veritable piracy" aboard it.

In 1912, U.S. consul Stuart J. Fuller and British consul George Mitchell travelled aboard the Liberal to investigate conditions in the Putumayo. Julio César Arana, photographer Silvino Santos, and Carlos Rey de Castro boarded before its arrival at La Chorrera and accompanied the consuls throughout their visit. The Liberal transported this group to La Chorrera, El Encanto, Argelia, Unión, and La Florida. The Peruvian Amazon Company later published an album featuring Santos's photographs from this journey. Ubaldo Lores was captain during the consular commission. The Indigenous concubine of Andrés O'Donnell was also transported back to the Putumayo aboard the vessel during this expedition.

=== 1913–1933 ===
Crime swelled in proportion to the rubber returned and increased step by step with the number of kilogrammes obtained. Thus, the larger the number of murders, the higher the production, meaning that a large proportion of the rubber was produced out of blood and corpses. This fact, one of the most notable features of the criminality in the Putumayo, could be substantiated by statistics which should not be difficult to obtain at the custom-house, based on the cargoes sent to the Putumayo by the steamers Liberal and Cosmopolita between 1906 and 1911, and the return shipments of rubber brought by these vessels. From these statistics, it could be shown what effect has been produced by the present campaign on behalf of the indigenous people of the Putumayo. It could be proved by the incontestable eloquence of figures that, whereas between 1905 and 1910 little or nothing was sent in terms of provisions and supplies, these steamers returned with enormous cargoes of 80 to 100 tons of rubber. Today the situation has radically changed, as the steamers that departed with full cargoes (especially provisions) have returned with very little rubber.

— Rómulo Paredes, Precis of the Report of Dr. Rómulo Paredes, Chapter VIII (Note: This section is titled "Principal massacres and the places where they were committed: Crime on the Putumayo: causes of its development.")

Gaspar de Pinell boarded the Liberal on October 9, 1918, with permission from the vessel's commander, Captain Celso Prieto of the Peruvian Navy. Prieto agreed to transport Pinell to El Encanto because he held a letter of recommendation from Arana. Pinell referred to Casa Arana y [Cecilio] Hernández as the sole authorities on the Igaraparana and Caraparana rivers at the time.

According to Huitoto professor Aurelio Rojas, approximately 1,000 soldiers arrived in the Putumayo aboard Liberal in 1917, and these troops were used to suppress an indigenous rebellion against Arana's enterprise. (Note: Rojas’s oral testimony included descriptions of punishment inflicted upon the Indigenous population in retaliation.) Pinell also stated that an indigenous uprising occurred in 1917 against Arana's company and that it was suppressed by the Peruvian military, which deployed a machine gun during the conflict. However, Pinell did not specify whether the soldiers were transported to the Putumayo rubber estates aboard Liberal.

According to an oral history provided by Florentina Piña de Miveco, Liberal transported members of the Aguaje Bora nation from their native lands in the Putumayo region to Remanso following the rebellion. Years later, Arana's enterprise, together with Miguel S. Loayza, organized another migration of Putumayo natives in order to maintain a labour force during the transition of the Peruvian–Colombian border under the Salomón–Lozano Treaty. Piña de Miveco stated that during this period, Liberal transported various groups to the Algodón tributary, from where migrants continued on foot for several days until reaching the Yahuasyacu River.

Liberal also transported Peruvian soldiers during the 1921 insurrection of Loreto. Lieutenant Colonel Teobaldo González, aboard the steamship Beatriz, joined forces with Liberal at the confluence of the Huallaga and Marañón rivers. González commanded 140 soldiers on Beatriz, while Lieutenant Azcaraté commanded 120 soldiers and two officers aboard Liberal. The combined force advanced toward Puerto Meléndez, and Liberal was later sent to search for a detachment of missing soldiers. During this time, government troops arrived at Puerto Meléndez aboard the steamship Hamburgo and attacked González's group, many of whom fled into the jungle. Government forces on Hamburgo subsequently persuaded the soldiers aboard Liberal to surrender unconditionally.

Liberal later formed part of a flotilla that travelled to the Prefecture of Iquitos, alongside the gunboat América and the steamships Adolfo, Luz II, San Pablo, and Cahuapanas.

During the Colombia–Peru War, Liberal was commanded by Lieutenant Commander Manuel R. Nieto and Lieutenant José Mosto. The two officers were ordered to travel towards Leticia with the steamship. They organized defensive measures consisting of mines and torpedoes, with the objective of impeding the advance of enemy reinforcements along the river.
