= Julio César Arana =

Peruvian entrepreneur and politician

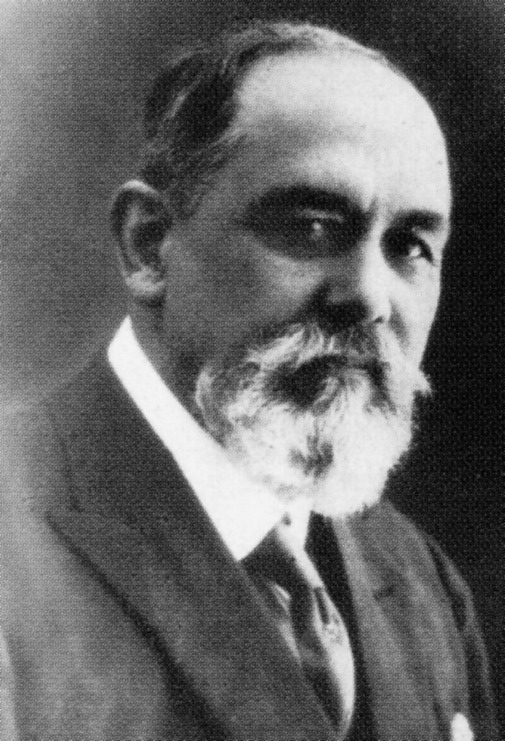
- Julio César Arana del Águila. Estudio Courret. Lima, c. 1912

Senator of the Republic of Peru for Loreto
- In office July 28, 1922 – October 12, 1929

Mayor of Iquitos
- In office 1902–1903

Personal details
- Born: Julio César Arana; April 12, 1864 Rioja, Peruvian Republic
- Died: September 7, 1952 (aged 88) Magdalena del Mar, Lima, Peruvian Republic
- Spouse: Eleanora Zumaeta (m. 1887)

Julio César Arana del Águila (April 12, 1864 – September 7, 1952) was a Peruvian entrepreneur and politician who was the general manager of the Peruvian Amazon Company and the main perpetrator behind the Putumayo genocide.

A major figure in the rubber industry in the upper Amazon basin, he is infamously known in the English-speaking world through Walter E. Hardenburg's 1909 articles in the British magazine Truth, exposing his practices that amounted to a terroristic reign of slavery over the natives of the region. A company of which he was the general manager, the Peruvian Amazon Company, was investigated by a commission in 1910 on which Roger Casement served. He was appointed its liquidator in September 1911. He later blamed the downfall of the company on the British directors for neglecting to manage the Peruvian staff, of whom he was chief. Arana was the main perpetrator of the Putumayo genocide: where his company exploited and exhausted Indigenous populations to death, to extract rubber. Arana's enterprise also had operations along the Caqueta, Marañon, and Upper Purus Rivers.

Arana became a senator for the Department of Loreto from 1922 to 1926 and, as a result of the Salomon-Lozano Treaty, signed in Lima in 1927, Peru transferred his properties in the Putumayo to Colombia. He died at age 88, penniless, in a small house in Magdalena del Mar in Lima.

== Early life ==
Julio César Arana was born to Martín Arana in Rioja, Peru, on April 12, 1864. The family was from Cajamarca, in the north of Peru and close to the Amazonian forests to the east. Martín Arana made a career out of making and selling straw hats in Rioja. Julio joined him at age nine and spent the next few years learning about the trade. At age 15, his father sent him to Cajamarca to learn bookkeeping and general business administration, rather than see his son go to war against Chile. After two years in Cajamarca, Julio ventured to the jungle, confident that he knew enough about business to take advantage of new opportunities. The rubber boom had just started to affect the Amazon, although it was years away from its peak.

Julio decided to move to the town of Yurimaguas, which was on the Huallaga River, a tributary of the Marañon River. From there, he was able to sell his father's hats in various towns of the Amazon basin. He believed he could make more money in the rubber trade, but he lacked the funds to invest in a business venture. In 1888, he married Eleanora Zumaeta; they had known each other as children in Rioja. He was able to secure some funding out of the convenient marriage and invited his new brother-in-law, Pablo Zumaeta, to join him in business. The two opened up a trading post in Tarapoto, which was a district rich in rubber and close to Yurimaguas. The very next year, they bought a portion of a rubber forest near Yurimaguas.

Arana and Zumaeta soon traveled to the Ceará region in Brazil, which had recently suffered a dust bowl and famine. They secured and hired twenty men, taking advantage of their destitute situation. These men would be the first debt peons of Arana, exploited for their labor. (Note: By the time the men from Ceará got off of the boat, they owed Arana £30.) In 1889, Arana invited another brother-in-law, Abel Alarco, to join him at Iquitos, where they could set up business. Arana originally focused his business on peddling and transportation around Iquitos before becoming specifically interested in rubber forests in the Putumayo basin. Julio adopted the practices of the Colombians in the region, who enslaved indigenous people and exploited their labor to extract rubber. (Note: "his company methods led to massive tribal extermination." Angus Mitchell, editor of the Amazon Journal of Roger Casement.)

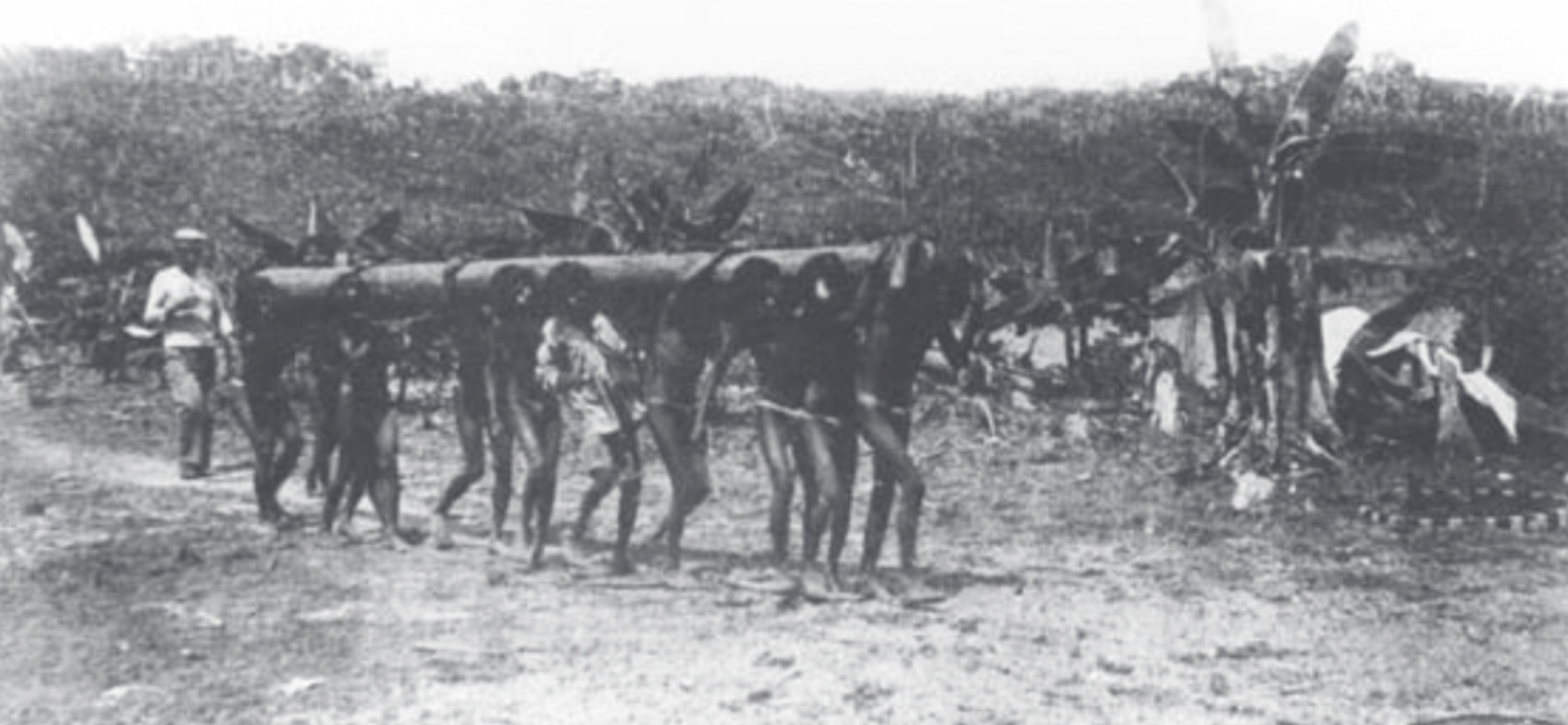
A group of Huitoto natives, forced to work at 'Colonia India', a plantation belonging to Julio César Arana

== Rubber baron ==
Julio Arana started multiple enterprises in collaboration with different business partners in the 1890s. Two of these notable partners include Juan B. Vega and Luis F. Morey, who established the Vega, Morey y Compania in 1890. (Note: In 1900 Morey's own enterprise would become the fourth largest exporting firm in Iquitos. The next year, in 1901, he became senator for the department of Loreto.) Another company founded in the same year was Arana y Vega Ltda, a commercial firm that had an office on the Javary River. This relationship helped to facilitate transportation for Arana's expanding enterprise. In 1896, Arana moved his family to Iquitos. That same year, the Galvez steamship, owned by Arana and captained by his brother Lizardo, travelled down the Caraparaná River and purchased six tons of rubber from Colombians that were settled there.

Arana began trading with Benjamin Larrañaga and his son Rafael in 1896. The Larrañaga's owned La Chorrera, a settlement on the Igaraparaná where they enslaved the native population to extract rubber. Some of the enslaved native groups used for labor in the Putumayo include: Huitoto, Andoque, Bora, Ocaina, Muinane, Resígaros, Yagua, Nonuyas and Yurias. Sometime in 1898, Arana established a commercial house in Iquitos for his enterprise. His largest competitor in the city, Carlos Fitzcarrald, drowned in an accident on the Urubamba River the previous year.

Arana soon began peddling firearms, liquor, and goods with other Colombians along the Putumayo, negotiating business with as many of them as possible. In 1901, Arana established the Larrañaga, Arana y compañia, with Benjamin Larrañaga as a business partner. There was an armed conflict between the Larrañaga's and several other Colombian patron's on the Putumayo, as the latter wanted to evict the Larrañga's from the region.

Information later provided by Rómulo Paredes, a judge in Iquitos, stated that Arana arrived on the Putumayo steamship at La Chorrera and intermediated a meeting between the two groups of Colombians. An agreement was made to pay Rafael Tobar and his companions 50,000 sols, and the Calderón Hermanos were paid 14,000 for a settlement they built on the Igaraparana River. Paredes did not provide a date for this meeting, however Rafael Tobar, Cecilio Plata, Juan Cabrera, and Aquiléo Torres were arrested at La Chorrera in July 1901, and then taken to Iquitos as prisoners. Those four Colombians were the original patrons of the rubber stations Entre Rios, Atenas, and La Sabana. (Note: These stations would later become correspondingly managed by Andrés O'Donnell, Elías Martinengui, and Aristides Rodriguez for Arana's enterprise.) Under Arana's enterprise, the indigenous peoples subjugated at these rubber stations delivered latex to La Chorrera, and this product would then be shipped to Iquitos.

By 1902, Arana's enterprise accounted for 8 percent of Iquitos total rubber exports: and about 5 percent of its total imports. In this year, he became the mayor of Iquitos due to his success and reputation. By this time, most of the Colombian entrepreneurs in the region were on Arana's books. If the Colombians in the Putumayo wanted to sell their rubber, they would have to go to Iquitos. From Iquitos, they managed to secure the supplies they needed and negotiate credit. Arana facilitated everything for them.

In 1903, Arana established the J.C. Arana y Hermanos firm, which had its headquarters in Iquitos and an office in Manaus. Arana's brother Lizardo, along with his brother in laws Abel Alarco and Pablo Zumaeta had managing roles in this new company. (Note: In the words of Walter E. Hardenburg: "These three monsters are jointly responsible with Julio César Arana for the hellish crimes of the Putumayo to be described later.") The headquarters in Iquitos was managed by Pablo Zumaeta, and the office in Manaus was directed by Lizarado Arana. Zumaeta was general manager of the company, responsible for operations in the Putumayo: while Lizardo was responsible for commercial transactions in the commercial hub that was Manaus.

Arana met the French explorer Eugène Robuchon onboard Arana's steamship the Preciada, around July 1903. Robuchon was intrigued with the information Arana provided about his estates in the Putumayo region and Robuchon decided to deviate from his original exploration plans in order to explore the Huitoto territory. The Peruvian Prime Minister in 1903, José Pardo, sent a telegraph to Arana in November 1903 suggesting that Arana employ the French explorer Eugene Robuchon to explore the property of J.C. Arana y Hermanos. A contract between Arana and Robuchon was officially signed on August 30, 1904, whereupon Robuchon agreed to carry out geographic, ethnologic work among other similar studies, as well as take photographs in the region and to produce maps. Robuchon also agreed that he would make suggestions regarding reforms "to improve and extend the exploitation of the said region, principally with regard to obtaining rubber."

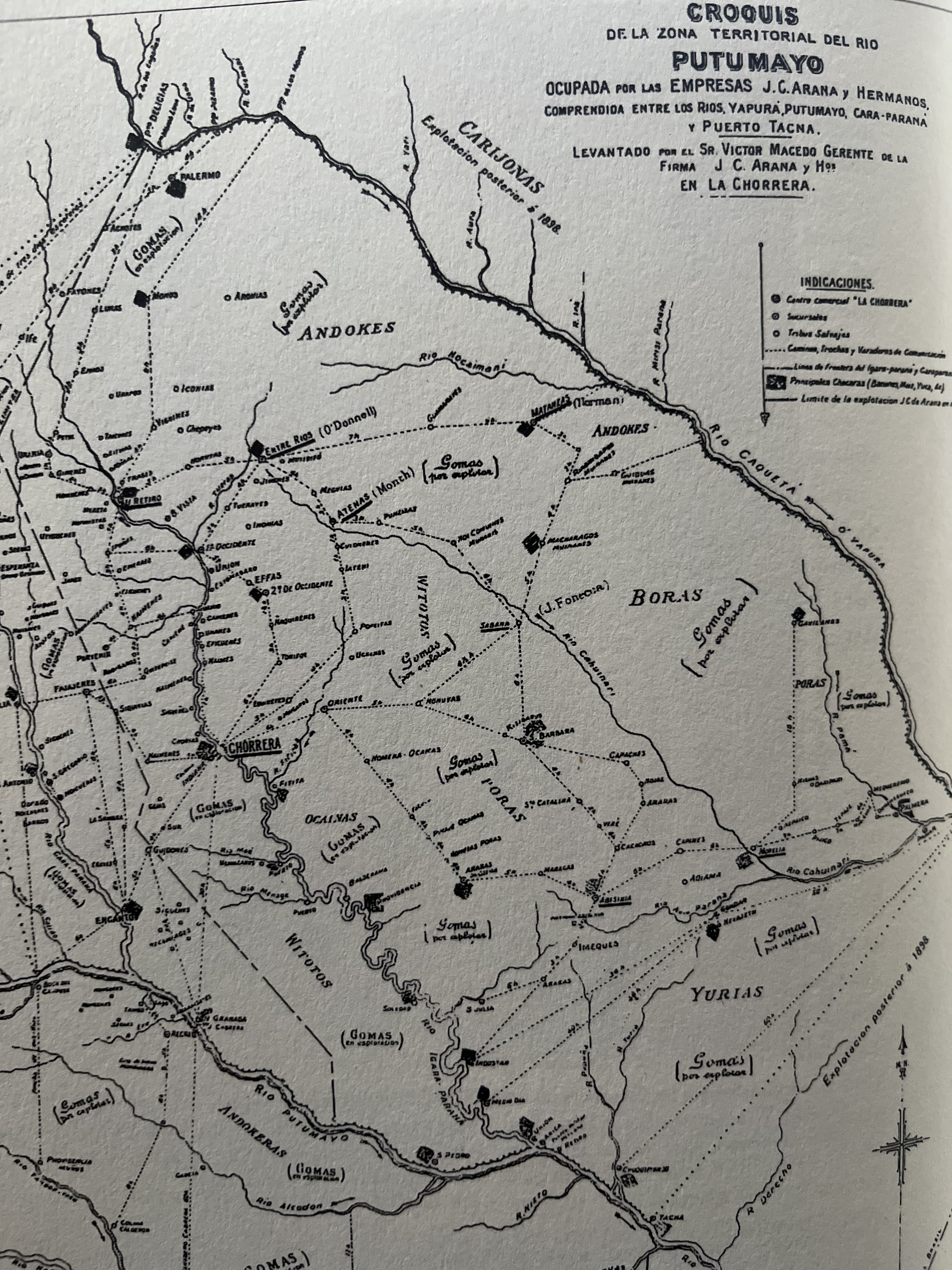
Map of the J.C Arana y Hermanos estate between the Igara-Paraná and Caqueta Rivers

After the death of Benjamin Larrañaga in December 1903, Arana bought out the son, Rafael's share. (Note: In Walter E. Hardenburg's words: "taking advantage of their ignorance and stupidity to rob them scandalously." Norman Thomson's information stated that Benjamin perished "from the symptoms of Arsenic poisoning," and his son, Rafael was imprisoned at Iquitos. The Larrañaga estate was sold to Arana, and Rafael disappeared "among the Indians" according to Thomson's source.) From 1904 onwards, Arana and his company annexed Colombian rubber properties, "amounting to more than 40 settlements". (Note: This would later include the estates of Nueva Granada, Argelia, Remolino and the property of Ordonez y Martinez on the Caraparaná River at Union.) Arana's enterprise carried this out through encouraging the Colombians to sell their estates, indebting the Colombians, or by forceful actions to acquire the Colombia estates. After securing La Chorrera from the Larrañaga's, he bought out Gregorio Calderón and the Calderón hermanos at El Encanto. The Calderón's had a reported workforce of 3,500 Huitoto natives that were dedicated to the extraction of rubber along the Caraparaná River, and this workforce was also acquired by Arana.

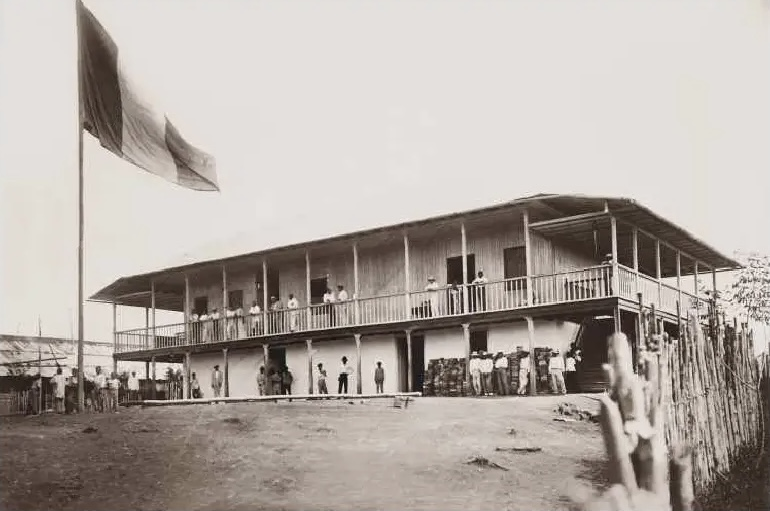
The main house at El Encanto, a rubber plantation belonging to Arana's enterprise.

In February 1904, a steamship belonging to Arana's company, named the Acreana, was seized by Brazilian authorities on the Upper Purus River while en route to deliver supplies to rubber tappers on the Curanja tributary. Another steamship named Mercedes, which belonged to Carlos Scharff, was also captured by the same group of Brazilians. On March 30 of 1904, the Mercedes along with the Acreana were used to deliver a group of around 270 armed Brazilians to attack a group of Peruvians between the Chandless and Curanja Rivers. Arana's business representative aboard the Acreana decided to abandon this business venture since it would be dangerous to travel any further towards their original destination and a decision was made to leave the ship's cargo at the Acre River's mouth then travel back to Manaus, which they arrived at on May 17. Arana's company later filed a reimbursement claim to the Brazilian government for the losses the company incurred during this incident.

The Liberal steamship was commissioned by Arana's enterprise and completed in October 1904. Liberal first arrived in Iquitos in December 1904. It was estimated that this ship cost between £6,000-7,000 a year to operate.

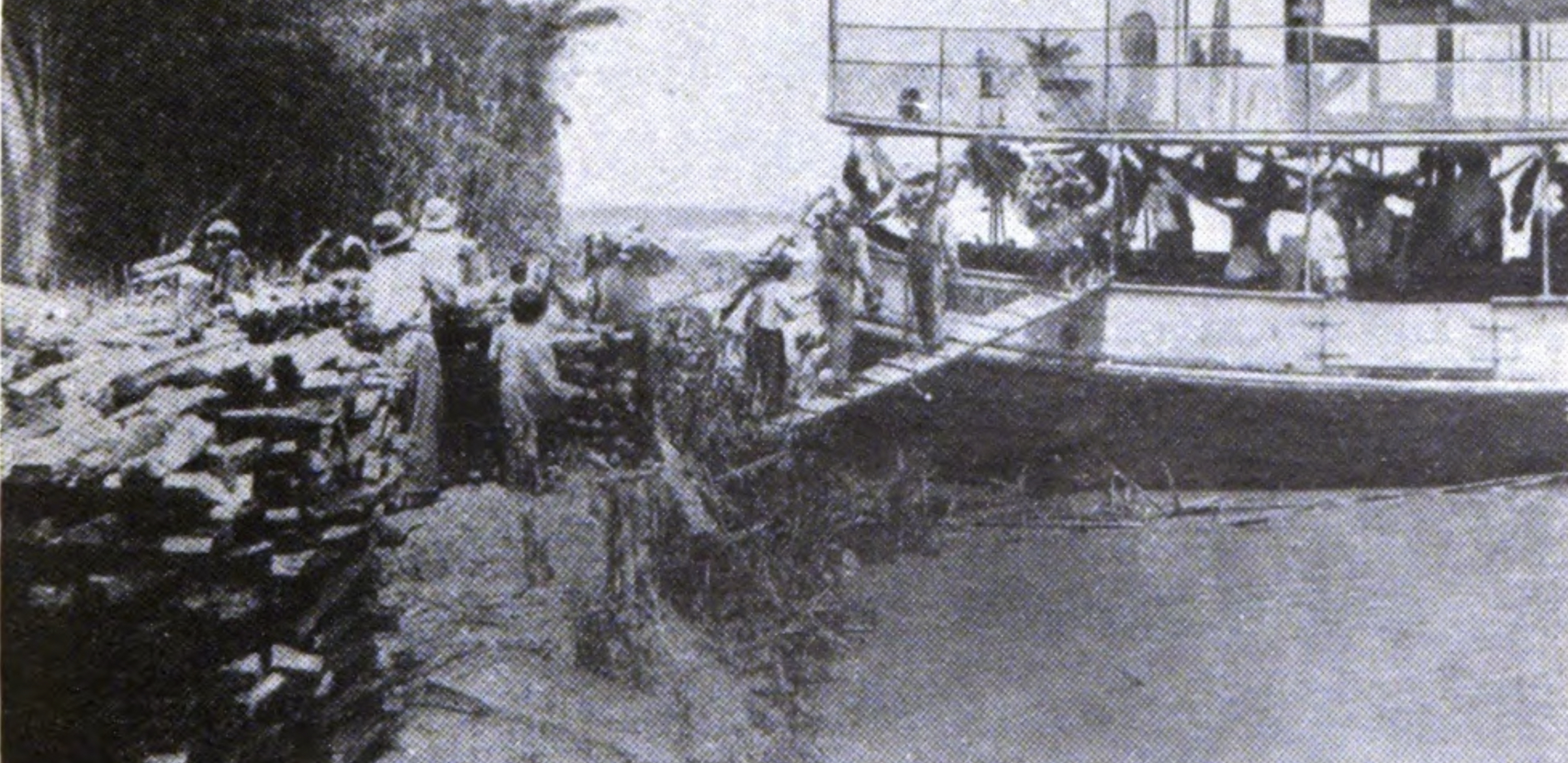
The Liberal steamship owned by Julio César Arana, embarking rubber

In 1904, Arana sent his brother-in-law Abel Alarco to take advantage of the economic crisis occurring in Barbados. Barbados was a frequent stop along the Booth Steam Ship Co. route that took rubber to Liverpool. Over the course of 9 months somewhere around 200 men from the island became indentured to the company, initially for a period of 2 years. Some of these Barbadian men protested to the British vice-consul in Manaus when they found out what the nature of their work in Peru entailed, however they were told they must fulfill the contracts they signed with Arana's company. Some of the Barbadians refused to do so, and they were taken into custody by local police and escorted onto a boat that would take them to the Putumayo.

When the Barbadians arrived to the Putumayo region near the end of 1904, they were used as enforcers against the natives. These men were foreigners with no connection to the people or land in the Putumayo, and they stood out. It was virtually impossible for them to run away from the territory. At the end of 1904, (Note: César Arana stated that the first contingent of Barbadians arrived in the Putumayo in November of 1904.) an expedition of around thirty Barbadian men was sent out from La Chorrera to set up the plantation of Matanzas, near the Caqueta River. Armando Normand accompanied them, and would later become the manager of that station.

Matanzas was originally established as a joint venture between a Colombian named Ramon Sanchez and Arana. An investigation later carried out by Roger Casement determined that the Barbadians had committed horrible atrocities at the behest of their overseers. They were the perpetrators of many floggings and murders committed against the natives. The investigation determined, that when the Barbadians complained or were defiant, they "received ill-treatment and were subjected to torture, for which they do not appear to have received any compensation as British subjects."

The French explorer Robuchon disappeared in 1906 near the confluence of the Cahuinari tributary with the Caqueta River. Some of Robuchon's photographic plates were later recovered and were passed around in Iquitos. There were also rumors circulating at the time that Robuchon was murdered by Arana's employees because he had taken incriminating photographs of abuse and atrocities in the Putumayo. Robuchon's work was posthumously published by the Peruvian government in 1907 with the title En el Putumayo y sus afluentes. This book, which was edited by the Peruvian consul-general to Manaus, Carlos Rey de Castro, claimed that Robuchon was killed by indigenous cannibals. There were 20,000 copies of En el Putumayo y sus afluentes published at the expense of the Peruvian government, and the book would later be used as a prospectus for a company formed by Arana in 1907. (Note: This company formed in 1907 by Arana, was the Peruvian Amazon Company.) Rey de Castro's editing process intended to portray Arana's enterprise as a "civilising force" in the Peruvian Amazon.

By 1906 around 1,400,000 pounds of rubber was exported from the Putumayo by Arana's enterprise. (Note: In 1906, the Iquitos customs house declared that there was 644,897 kilograms of rubber transported from the Putumayo to England.) Arana continued his campaign against the Colombian patrons on the Putumayo River, and by 1907 most of them had disappeared. One prominent Colombian on the Caqueta River, named Cecilio Plata, was killed in a mutiny in 1907 and Las crueldades en el Putumayo y en el Caquetá insinuated that Arana had a role in instigating this rebellion. (Note: Walter E. Hardenburg also insinuated that Arana had Plata murdered. In Hardenburg's words: " It was in this epoch that Cecilio Plata and his employees were murdered on the banks of the Caquetá for having dared to enter into relations with the Indians of that region, who were afterwards enslaved by the criminal syndicate.") After Plata's death, two steamships belonging to Arana sailed from Manaus to Plata's estate, located at the confluence of the Caqueta and Apaporis Rivers, and occupied the estate, which then became a part of Arana's enterprise. In 1907, Arana temporarily moved his family to Biarritz, in France. (Note: His family moved to London near the end of 1909. Arana hired 14 service employees to attend his family on the property rented in Biarittz.)

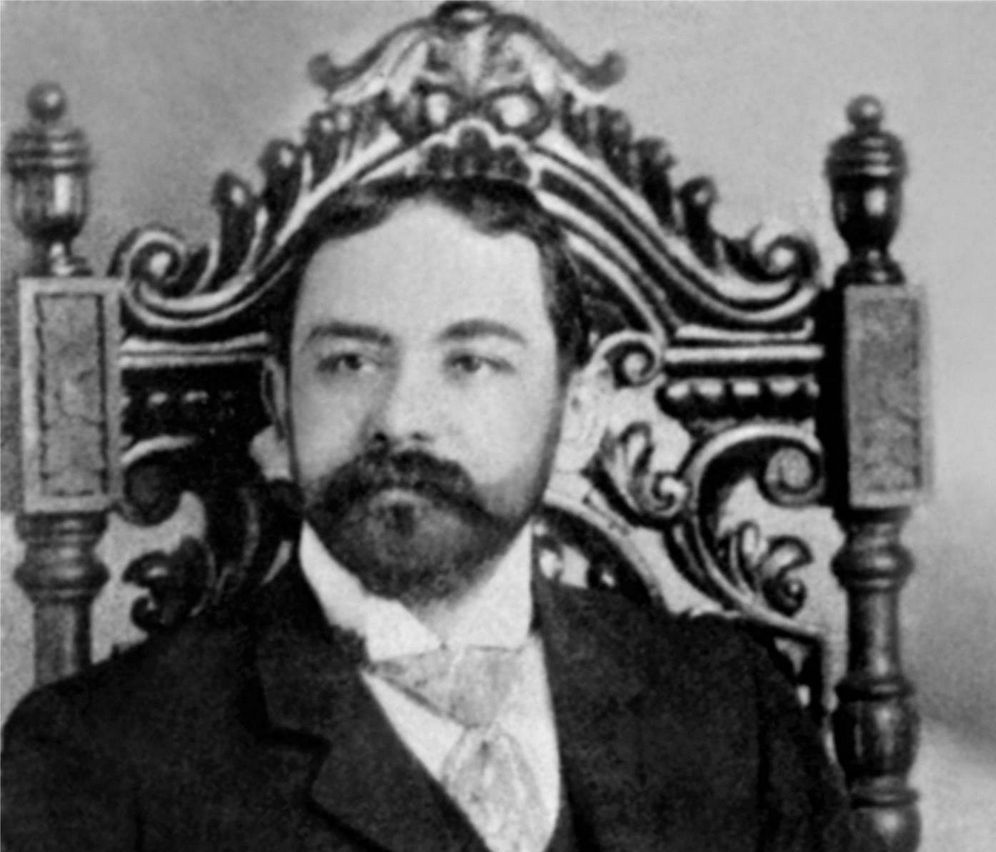
Julio César Arana in 1907

Benjamin Saldaña Rocca originally filed a criminal petition against 18 members of the J.C. Arana y Hermanos company, and urged the local courts to conduct an investigation. When he felt ignored, Saldaña founded the newspapers La Sancion on August 22, 1907: and La Felpa on August 31. The newspapers both published revelations and information that came from ex-employees of Arana. La Felpa used a political cartoon at its center to make its point. The very first issue of La Felpa had four different graphics captioned: "The Crimes of the Putumayo: FLAGELLATIONS, MUTILATIONS, TORTURES, AND TARGET PRACTICE." Saldaña's petition led to a judicial case against Arana however the local court in Iquitos declared a writ stating that they were "incompetent to act."

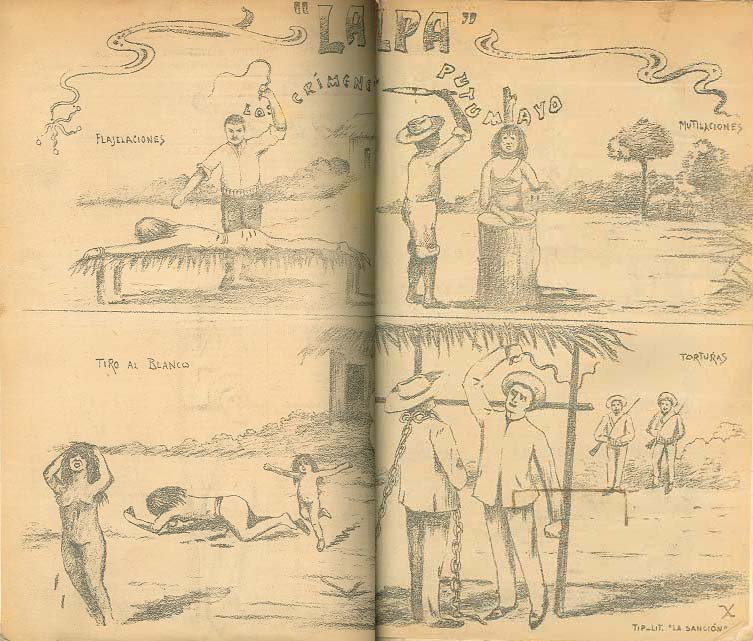
Illustration on the first issue of 'LA FELPA,' a newspaper published by Saldaña

On September 26, 1907 Arana established the Peruvian Amazon Company and had this company registered on the London stock market. The total equity of this new company was £1,000,000, a portion of which came from various English investors, some of whom became Peruvian Amazon Company directors. This company's territory was composed of property along the Igaraparaná, Caraparaná and Caquetá Rivers which Arana had previously acquired.

El Dorado, La Uníon, and La Reserva were the only notable Colombian settlements on the Cara-Paraná River and they were raided by Arana's firm in 1908. The American engineer Walter Ernest Hardenburg and his friend Walter Perkins were travelling along the Caraparana River, on the way to Bolivia and they were imprisoned by Arana's company around February 1908. Hardenburg was captured after massacres at La Uníon and La Reserva, while his friend Perkins was captured at La Reserva. Perkins told Hardenburg about the atrocities he had seen at La Reserva: and the murder of David Serrano along with 27 of his companions, perpetrated by employees of Arana's company, in cooperation with Peruvian soldiers. This information was corroborated by two eyewitnesses, one that provided a deposition to Hardenburg, named Julio Montero and another deposition on this incident was given by a Colombian named Carlos Muragaitio to a Colombian consulate.

Saldaña published two articles in La Felpa on February 1 and 8, which provided details on the attacks against Colombian settlements on the Caraparana. The articles implicated Miguel S. Loayza, Arana's manager at El Encanto, with organizing these attacks. (Note: The translated title for the article published on February 1 of 1908 is: "The crime of Lesa Patria" while the article published on February 8 was titled: "More about the Putumayo - sackings, arson, murder of wounded - violations and rape of women by the Arana Coy - Loayza conceives, prepares and executes the assault - No penal punishment." Both articles appears in Hardenburg's 1912 manuscript titled "A catalogue of crime", published by the National Library of Ireland.) The last issue of Saldaña Rocca's publications came out on February 22, 1908. He was tipped off that law enforcement was on their way to escort him out of Iquitos. Saldaña managed to collect his documents and store them with the mother of his son for safe keeping. The son, decided to give that body of work to Hardenburg and these documents inspired Hardenburg to continue investigating and exposing Arana's company.

Many statements were made to me, to the effect that the raid was organized by the Arana Brothers in order to dispossess the Colombians, who were not only competitors, but who offered a refuge to the Indians, who were flying from the persecution of the company; and as long as these independent establishments existed on the Caraparana, Indians would fly there, and there was a means of exit from the region. (Note: Casement started this whole quote as: "Señor Tizon explained it to me as a fight between Colombians and Peruvians: that the Colombians were endeavouring to come down and attack El Encanto, and possibly La Chorrera, and possibly dispossess the company, so the company took measures of defense; but as far as I have been able to ascertain, I cannot find that the Colombians were raiding the company's property at the time or that there was any serious threat of an attack by the Colombians.")

— Roger Casement

The commander of Peruvian forces in the Putumayo in 1908, Juan Pollack, issued arrest warrants for the men who had participated in the 1908 attacks and many of those perpetrators were taken to La Chorrera in chains. Arana, along with the Prefect of Loreto Carlos Zapata and the Peruvian consul-general to Manaus travelled together onboard the Cosmopolita steamship, to La Chorrera. Prefect Zapata arranged for the men imprisoned by Pollack to be released. Information later collected by Roger Casement implicated Arana with paying Zapata a bribe amounting to £7,000 during this incident. (Note: This information was provided by the English consul in Iquitos, David Cazes.) A British Parliamentary committee established in 1913 secured two statements from Colombians, one of which had sworn before the Criminal Circuit at Bogotá and the second statement was signed at Manaus. Both of these statements claimed that Arana had paid out this bribe, however one statement declared the payment was £8,000, while according to the second statement it was £5,000. (Note: This second statement, dated March 29, 1911 stated: "It was positively affirmed at that time in that region that Don Julio Arana had given to the Prefect of Iquitos £5,000 which seems credible, since in no other way can we explain that after the murders of La Reserva they should set them at liberty.") Casement also discovered that the Peruvian consul-general to Manaus, Carlos Rey de Castro, was a debtor to Arana's company in Manaus for a sum that ranged between £4,000-5,000 in 1909.

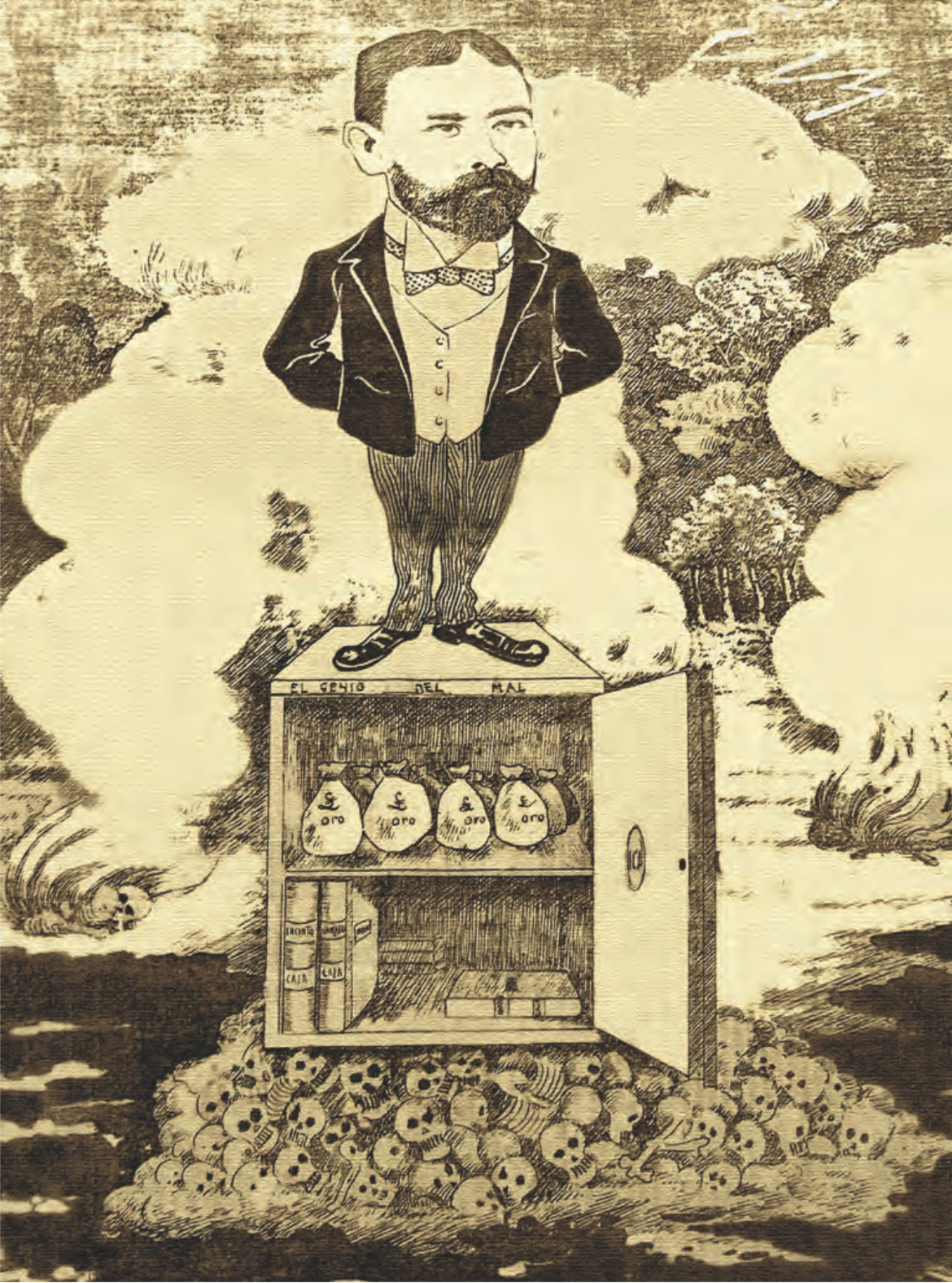
Illustration of Julio César Arana, published by the 'La Felpa' newspaper in 1908.

Julio F. Muriedas, an ex-employee of Arana that provided a deposition to Saldaña, and stated that in February 1908 he was working at an outpost belonging to Ildefonso Gonzalez on the Curary tributary of the Napo River. (Note: Gonzalez also happened to own El Dorado on the Cara-Parana River.) The deposition stated that Amadeo Burga, a Peruvian commissario, had pursued Muriedas throughout the Napo River with the intention of killing him because he was one of the first deponents that incriminated Arana and his syndicate with "awful crimes" in the Putumayo. Muriedas claimed that afterwards, Burga along with his eight soldiers travelled to an estate on the Tamboryacu tributary which belonged to Matias Perez. Burga ordered Perez to congregate all of his workers to inform them that they were now under the employment of Arana's firm. Burga threatened Perez that if he did not sell his estate for £20, then Burga would kill him. This statement was corroborated by another Hardenburg deponent named Fermín Torres, and Torres claimed that Perez's estate was really worth around £300.

Torres's deposition described the "violent possession" and seizure of an estate named El Pensamiento, by Burga. Muriedas stated that during the Pensamiento affair, Ildefonso Gonzalez was murdered during the process of transferring his peons to the Tamboryacu River. A Colombian named Carlos Murgaitio provided a testimony which appeared in Jornal de Comercio of Manaos and claimed that after Gonzalez was intimidated to leave his estate, he was murdered by a J.C. Arana y Hermanos manager named Olaneta. Regarding Gonzalez, Murgaito stated that "this man was one of the chief obstacles to the usurpation of the disputed territory." The Tamboryacu tributary had a portage route which linked the Putumayo River and the Napo River via the Campuya tributary of the Putumayo.

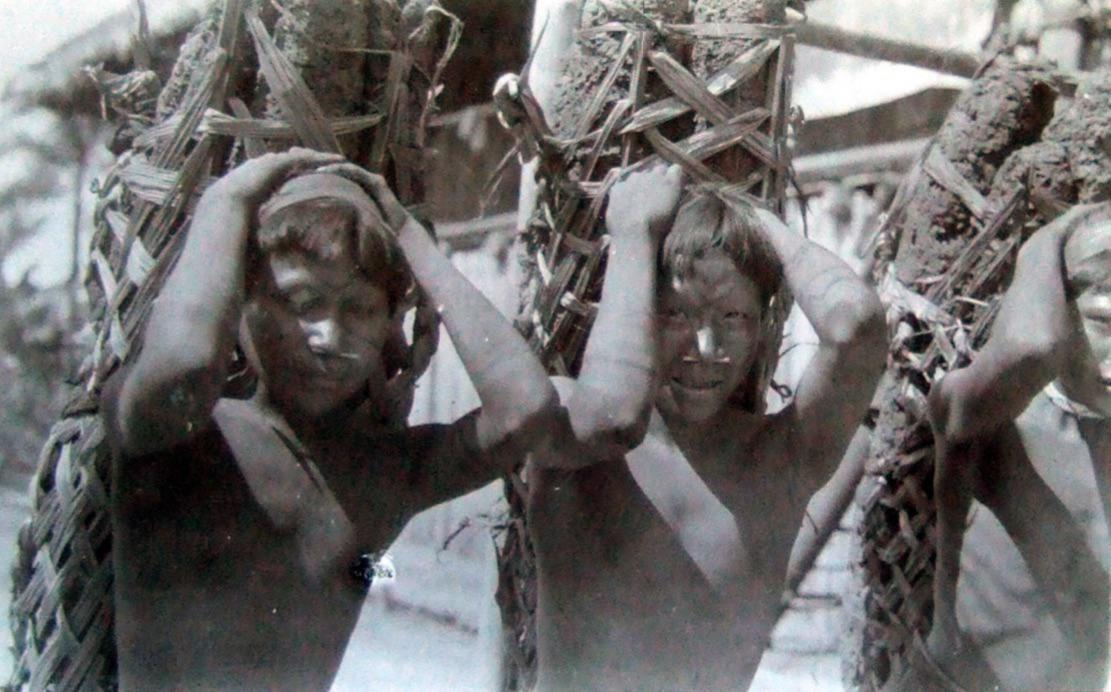
Enslaved natives with a load of rubber weighing 75 kilos, they have journeyed 100 kilometers with no food given

In May 1908 there was a civil conflict between Arana's company and David Cazes, the British consul in Iquitos and the owner of the Iquitos Trading Company. Both firms had a claim to the estate named Pensamiento, as its owner had recently died and owed money to both companies. Apparently Arana was interested in this property because it was the best route of escape for natives fleeing from the Putumayo towards the Napo River. A few Huitoto natives escaped from Arana's estate and fled towards Pensamiento, where they protested against their treatment to the previous owner's brother, who then brought that issue to Cazes. According to Cazes, these natives were "dreadfully scarred from flogging" and he tried to have them admitted as evidence in court at Iquitos, however the local prefect "Zapata and the Court had these Indians sent away" and the whole matter was covered up. Cazes managed to sell all of the rubber on the property before the commissario Amadeo Burga arrived to seize the estate for Arana. Burga was a brother in law to Pablo Zumaeta, as well as an employee of Arana's rubber firm. Afterwards, the courts issued an arrest order for Cazes and soldiers were sent to his house, which was also the British consulate. (Note: They were ordered to surround the house and arrest Cazes if he tried to leave.) Cazes was given an ultimatum by prefect Carlos Zapata, which was to either pay a £800 fee and surrender the claim to Pensamiento, or else his house would be invaded by authorities who would then arrest him, so Cazes decided to pay the money to the courts. (Note: Cazes later told Roger Casement he had personal knowledge that prefect Zapata was bribed by Arana to release the incarcerated perpetrators of the 1908 attacks against the Colombian estates in exchange for £7,000.) The natives who ran away to Pensamiento were collected by the commissario Burga and taken back to the Putumayo estates.

In 1910, English consul Roger Casement was sent to the Putumayo to investigate claims that Barbadians were perpetrating atrocities against natives while working for Arana's company. Previously in 1904, Casement wrote an investigative report on the Congo Free State, where atrocities were perpetrated against an enslaved indigenous work force which was dedicated to extracting rubber. Casement had no jurisdiction to investigate the Putumayo natives themselves because they were not English subjects. Through the Barbadian overseers, which were English subjects, Casement was able to learn about the atrocities occurring in the region. Casement collected thirty depositions from the Barbadian employees, which were full of criminal indictments. The report compiled by Casement was released in 1911, containing accounts by perpetrators and victims of the atrocities. The report sparked outrage, and eventually led to the liquidation of the Peruvian Amazon Company in 1913. An arrest warrant was issued against Julio César Arana by judge Carlos A. Valcárcel on December 10, 1912 however the court of Iquitos nullified this order. Arana and other important figures with roles in the Putumayo genocide were never prosecuted.

As a testament to the popularity of Arana's business partners in Iquitos, Pablo Zumaeta became the mayor of the city in 1912 and 1914, as well as between the years of 1922–1923. When Victor Macedo protested against his arrest warrant in Lima, the judge who issued the order was dismissed from office. The 236 other arrest warrants issued against Arana's employees were also dropped. Arana continued to export rubber under the name of a business partner, Cecilio Hernandez. Rubber from the Putumayo continued to be shipped towards Iquitos and then Britain. Years after the scandal, Julio César Arana became the senator of Loreto.

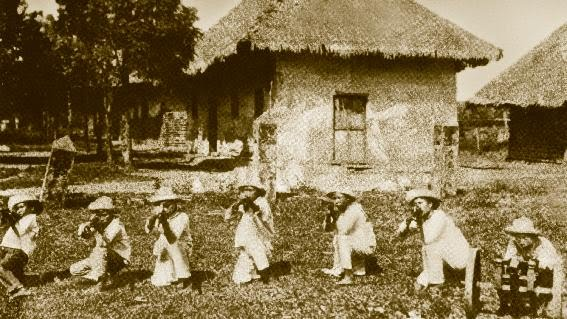
Muchachos de Confianza, indigenous killers and overseers for the Peruvian Amazon Company

== Later life ==
After the scandal and liquidation of the company, Arana retained a significant portion of its property, as well as the native work force. He was still popular enough in his home country to become a senator of Peru in 1921. That year, the Peruvian government gave Arana legal titles to his properties in the Putumayo. Julio César was one of the strongest opponents of the Salomón-Lozano Treaty, which gave Colombia the rights to the Putumayo region instead of Peru. In compensation for his loses, Julio wanted £2,000,000 from the Colombian government; however, they refused. The two governments did agree to respect concessions made to private individuals.

Before the border could change, Arana, along with Miguel S. Loayza and Carlos Loayza, organized a series of forced migrations. Over the next 8 years, natives from the right bank of the Putumayo were relocated in groups of 50–100 to the Ampiyacu basin in Loreto, Peru. At least 6,719 people from the Witotos, Boras, Andoques, Ocainas, and Muinanes tribes were relocated. Carlos Loayza stated that 50% of that group died off during the relocation: with malaria, smallpox, measles, and beriberi.

Years later Arana had a role in aggravating the political conflict into the Colombia-Peru War. He was part of the group of aristocrats who founded the 'Patriotic Junta of Loreto.' Julio's daughter was a part of the Junta, as well as his son, Luis Arana Zumaeta. The Aranas and the Morey family provided firearms for a makeshift force, which captured the port of Leticia on September 1, 1932. (Note: Ovidio Lagos, who wrote an extensive biography of Julio Arana, stated that the Arana's provided 44 rifles while Manuel Morey provided 200 Winchester rifles to the Junta.) A cease-fire was agreed upon four months later, which re-established the status quo of the treaty. The conflict was resolved shortly after the assassination of Peruvian president Luis Miguel Sánchez Cerro, who was killed while inspecting a parade of soldiers that were going to be sent to the Putumayo River. Sánchez's successor signed the Rio Protocol in 1934.

Arana sold his Colombian land concessions in 1939 during the Great Depression. Either from making a 'bad mistake' or being swindled, Julio seemingly came out of the situation penniless. A large amount of the money meant for Arana from this deal was never paid out during his lifetime.

For the last years of his life, Julio lived at Magdalena del Mar, a suburb of Lima. Julio César Arana died at 88 years old on September 7, 1952, with 'his passing virtually unnoticed by the public.' The grave of Arana is made from cement: and located in a common cemetery used for the poor. Ovidio Lagos concluded his biography of Julio Arana with the statement: "History did not place Julio César Arana among the heroes of Peru, nor among its criminals. It was much more cruel: it condemned him to oblivion." In 1964 the Colombian government paid the remaining sum of 160,000 dollars from the Putumayo estate sale to Víctor Israel, who was an ally and long-term business partner of Arana.

== Legacy ==
Arana's only son, Luis Arana Zumaeta, became a successful businessman in Iquitos and he was elected as the mayor of Iquitos several times. (Note: The Almanaque de Loreto lists Luis Arana as the mayor of Iquitos in 1945-1946, 1952-1953, 1963 and 1964-1966. In the epilogue of Ovidio Lagos's biography on Julio Arana, Lagos claims that Luis Arana was elected as mayor of Iquitos on nine different occasions.) Luis founded an import-export company that was based in Loreto named Suramérica, due to his business obligations and his political life he frequently travelled between Iquitos and Lima. He had a son, named Luis Arana Ramírez, which was the only grandson of Julio César Arana. Luis Arana Ramírez contracted polio when he was 8 years old and while he survived this infliction he was crippled and required a wheel chair to move around for the rest of his life.

Luis Arana Zumaeta committed suicide by shooting himself in the temple while at his residency in Iquitos in 1968. The biographer of Julio Arana, Ovidio Lagos, wrote that Luis's decision may have been influenced by criticism he received from a popular local radio journalist. This journalist denounced Luis's decision as mayor of Iquitos to cut down mango trees in the Plaza of July 28, the journalist referred to this as arboricide. Lagos noted that other people have theorized Luis's death was related to a cement deal that may have resulted in Luis's incarceration. Lagos wrote "[i]n any case, his death must be attributed to a depressive, disturbed personality, impossible to reveal. We can assume that he has heard more than once that his father was a murderer, to which we must add the loss of Putumayo, his family's contempt for his wife and his son's incurable illness..." Luis's wife and son, Luis Arana Ramírez, inherited "a considerable fortune" and later moved to Lima.

On September 27, 2002, the Canal 5 news station of Lima ran a program that depicted images of Luis Arana Ramirez and his mother "living in the most atrocious abandonment, in the most abject misery". While Arana Ramirez was restricted to a wheel chair, his mother, who was his only caretaker, had grown old. At the time of the news station program these two were in danger of dying from starvation. Both Arana Ramirez and his mother were taken to the Aurora Geriatric Clinic in Surco Lima. The mother perished from a fungal infection. Ovidio Lagos later interviewed Arana Ramirez, when he was around the age of 60. During the interview, Arana Ramirez stated "[c]onmigo terminan los Arana. Soy el último de esta especie" which may translate in English to "With me the Arana ends. I am the last of this species."

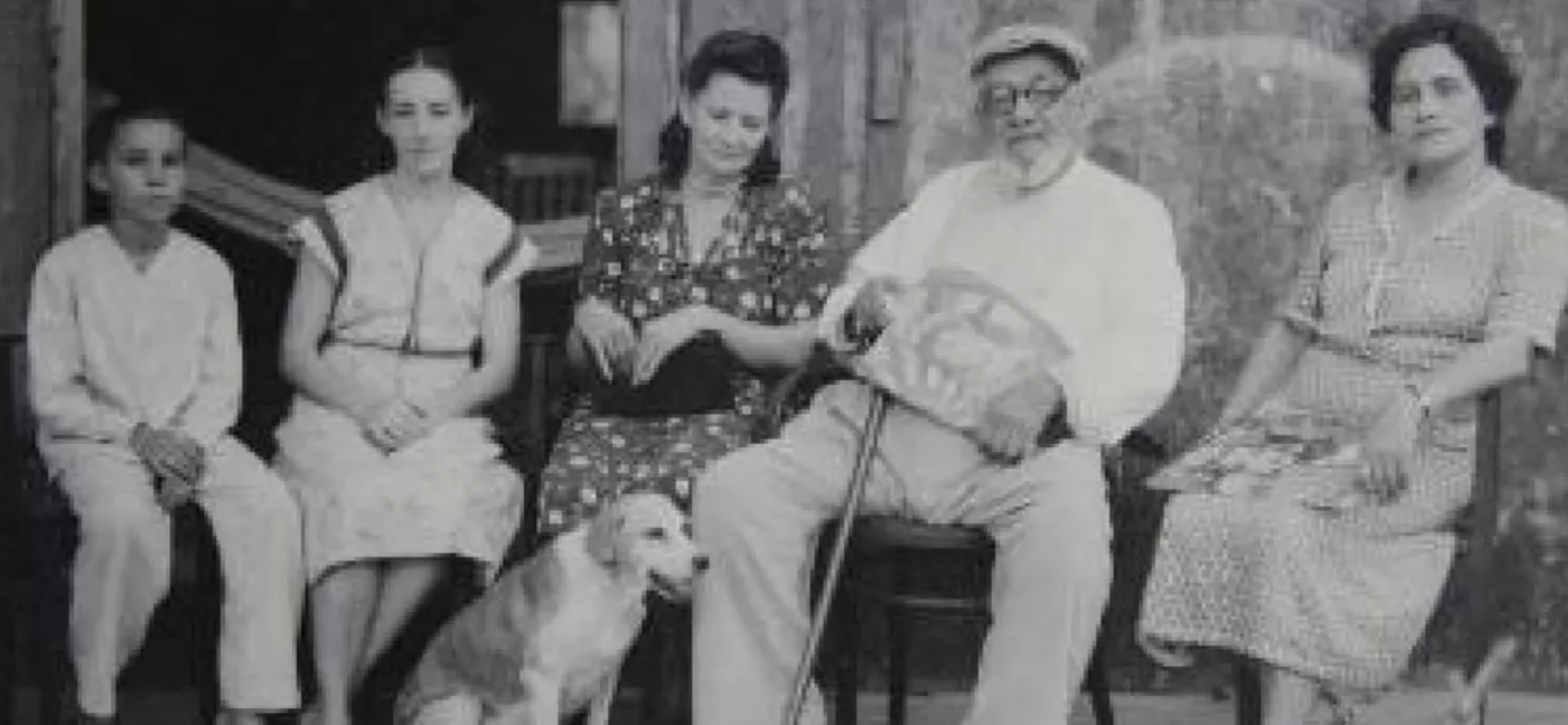
"Julio César Arana, his wife Eleanora Zumaeta and other companions." Photograph circa 1940.

== See also ==
- Putumayo genocide
- Peruvian Amazon Company
- Roger Casement
- Carlos Fitzcarrald
- Carlos Scharff
- Amazon rubber cycle
