= Henry Arana =

Puerto Rican composer of popular songs

Henry Arana Rodríguez (May 1, 1921 – February 23, 2008) was a composer of popular songs who was born in San Juan, Puerto Rico and lived all but the last years of his life in Puerto Rico. At the time of his death, from complications related to a neurological disease, he was residing in Alabama and was married to Carmen Mártir Santiago. He served in the United States Army in World War II.

Arana composed hundreds of songs made popular by a wide variety of Puerto Rican artists, including Cano Estremera, Bobby Valentín, Willie Rosario, El Gran Combo, Cortijo y su Combo, Tito Rojas, Andy Montañez, Gilberto Santa Rosa, La Sonora Ponceña, Mario Ortiz and Mario Hernández, as well as Mexican artists, such as Adrián Alejandro.

Among his best-known compositions are "Mi Puerto Rico", which was played as his remains were laid to rest at the Puerto Rico National Cemetery in Bayamón, Puerto Rico, "La novia automática", "Awilda", "Sanjuanero", "Por culpa de tu amor", "Como sube la gasolina" and "La gringa". His "Samba con Salsa", composed in the 1980s was a precursor of the fusion music that was popularized twenty years later.
