= Ezequiel Arana =

Spanish footballer (born 1986)

Personal information
- Full name: Ezequiel Arana de Palacio
- Date of birth: 1 May 1986 (age 40)
- Place of birth: El Puerto de Santa María, Spain
- Height: 1.77 m (5 ft 10 in)
- Position: Left back

Youth career
- CD Safa
- Cádiz

Senior career*
Years	Team	Apps	(Gls)
2003–2009	Cádiz B		
2004–2009	Cádiz	2	(0)
2005–2006	→ Málaga B (loan)	23	(0)
2007	→ Racing Portuense (loan)	4	(0)
2007–2008	→ Jaén (loan)	0	(0)
2009–2010	Puerto Real	11	(0)
2010	Jerez Industrial	1	(0)
2010–2011	Racing Portuense	28	(0)
2011–2013	Sanluqueño	58	(1)
2013–2014	La Roda	13	(0)
2014–2015	San Fernando	32	(0)
2015–2018	Sanluqueño	73	(2)
2018–2020	Xerez	49	(1)
2021–2022	Racing Portuense	18	(0)

International career
2004	Spain U19	1	(0)
- * Club domestic league appearances and goals

Ezequiel Arana de Palacio (born 1 May 1986), simply known as Ezequiel, is a Spanish former footballer who played as a left back.

== Club career ==
Born in El Puerto de Santa María, Province of Cádiz, Ezequiel graduated from local Cádiz CF's youth system, making his senior debuts with the reserves in the 2003–04 season. On 24 April 2004, he made his professional debut with the Andalusians' main squad, starting in a 2–2 away draw against Ciudad de Murcia in the Segunda División championship; in the 2005 summer he was loaned to Málaga CF B, also in the second tier.

In the following years, Ezequiel competed in the Segunda División B and the Tercera División, representing Racing Club Portuense (two stints), Real Jaén, Puerto Real CF, Jerez Industrial CF, Atlético Sanluqueño CF, La Roda CF, San Fernando CD and Atlético Sanluqueño CF.
