= Francisco Lara Arano =

Mexican politician

- Born: 9 June 1959 (age 66); Veracruz, Mexico
- Education: Universidad Veracruzana
- Occupation: Politician
- Political party: PAN

Francisco Javier Lara Arano (born 9 June 1959) is a Mexican politician affiliated with the National Action Party. As of 2014 he served as Deputy of the LIX Legislature of the Mexican Congress as a plurinominal representative.
