= Hector Arana =

American motorcycle racer

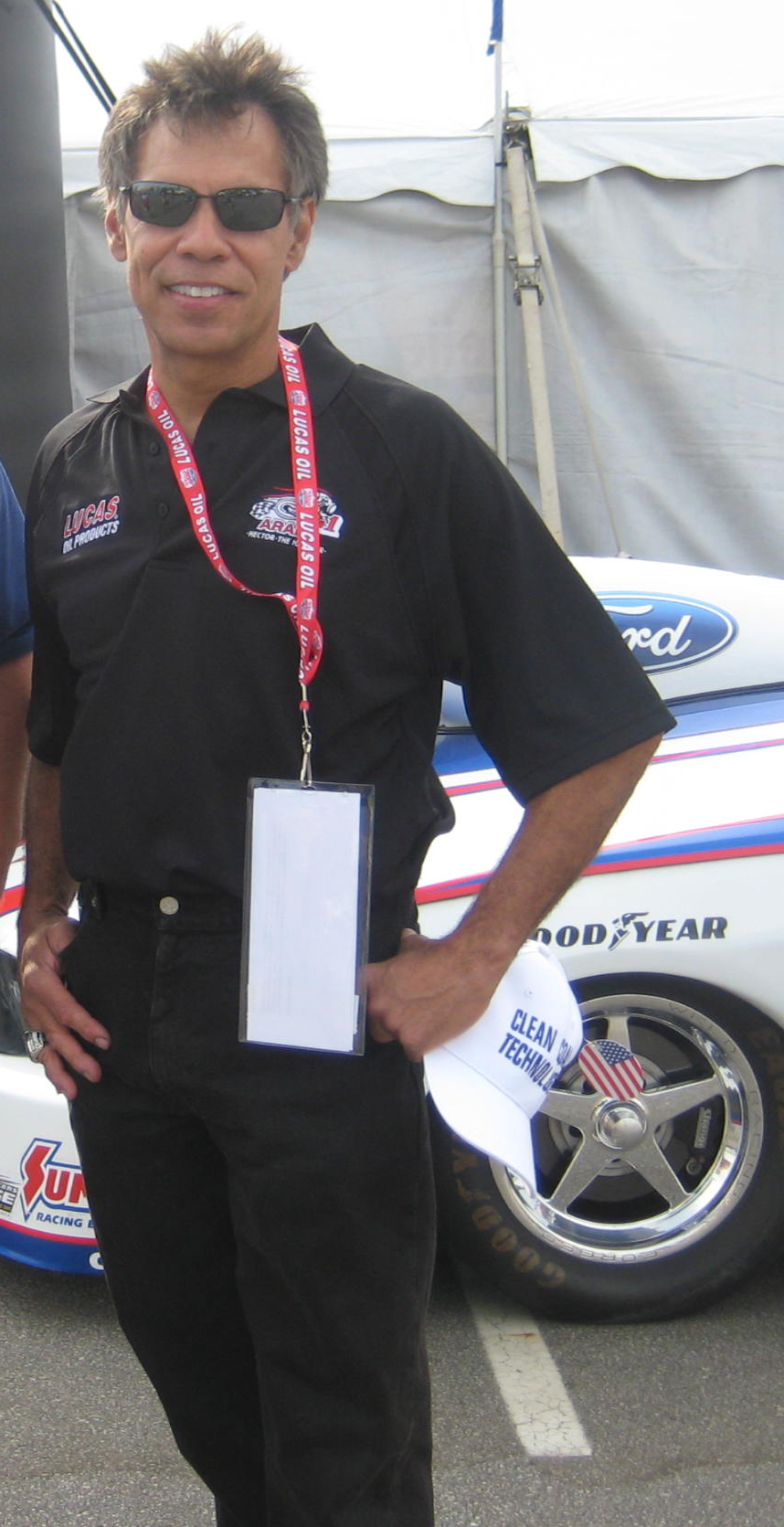
Hector Arana

Hector Arana is an NHRA Full Throttle Drag Racing Pro Stock Motorcycle racer. In the 2009 season, he won the Motorcycle season championship.
