= Txe Arana =

Catalan actress

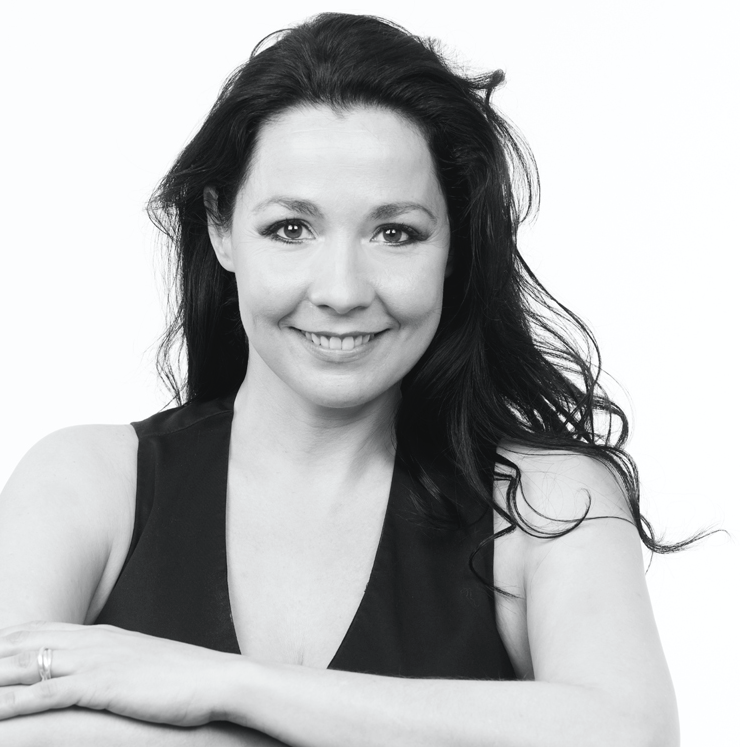
- Arana in 2020
- Born: 1972 (age 53–54); Lleida, Catalonia, Spain
- Occupations: Actress, Television hostess
- Years active: 1993-present
- Txe Arana's voice Recorded in December 2022

Txe Arana (Lleida, Spain, 1972) is a Catalan actress and television hostess.

== Career ==
She started her career in 1993 in the musical TV show Sputnik. She has also worked as a voice actor in many audiovisual productions, such as the II Premis Gaudí ceremony organised by the Catalan Film Academy on 1 February 2010. She is also a collaborator in the online magazine Esguard.

Txe Arana is a supporter of Catalan Independence, and she took part in a campaign to encourage participation in the 2014 Independence referendum.

== Filmography ==
=== Television ===
- 1993: Sputnik (presenter)
- 1993: Tres senyores i un senyor (presenter)
- 1998–2000: Laberint d'ombres
- 1999: Coses de la vida (presenter)
- 2001: Temps de silenci (2 episodes)
- 2005: El cor de la ciutat
- 2007: Colors en sèrie (voice, episode "Vermell")
- 2007: Un lloc per viure (voice, documentary)
- 2009–2010: Ànima
- 2010: Adéu, Espanya? (voice, documentary)
- 2007– present: MIC, Televisió de Catalunya (voice-over)

=== Cinema ===
- 2008: Reality, short film by Kim Gázquez
- 2009: Marcianas, short film by Sintu Amat
- 2017: Barcelona 1714, by Anna M. Bofarull
