= Andoque people =

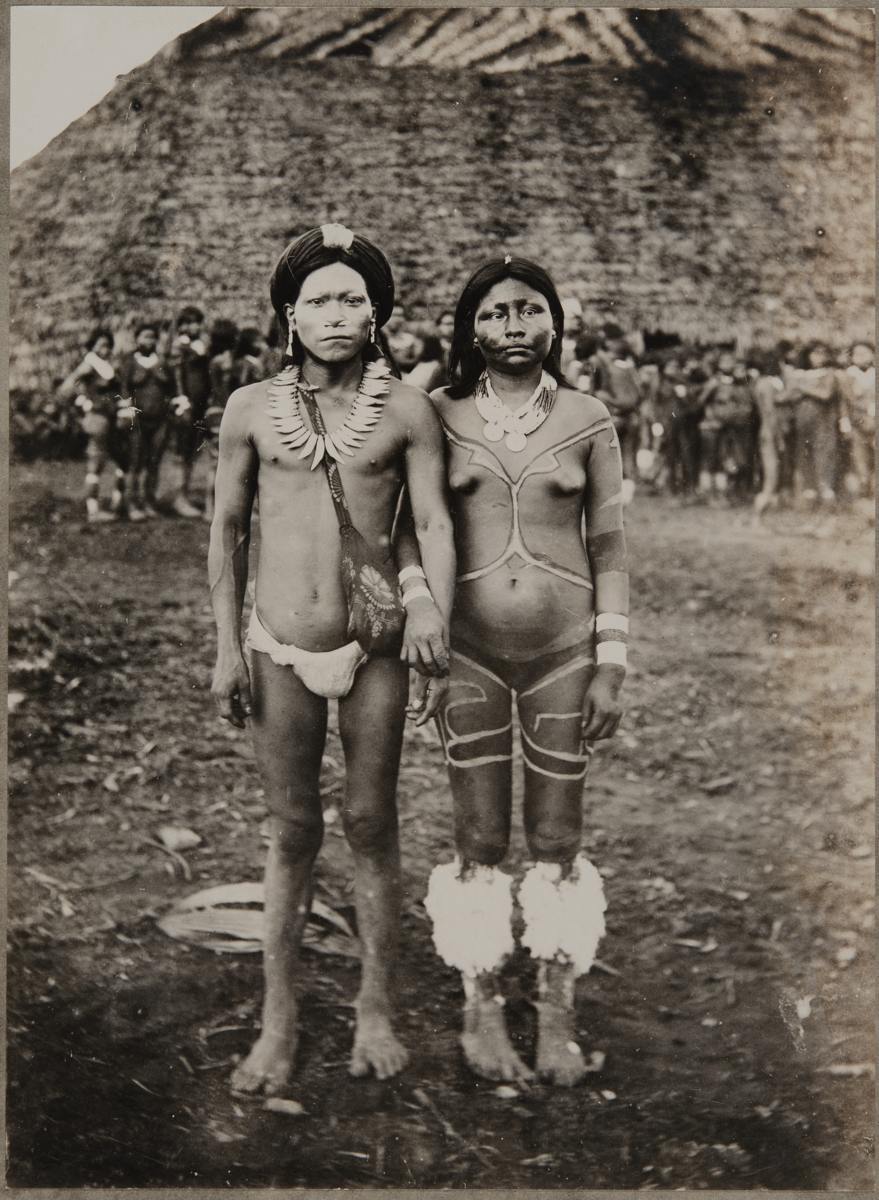
An Andoque "medicine man" (shaman) and his wife, c. 1909.

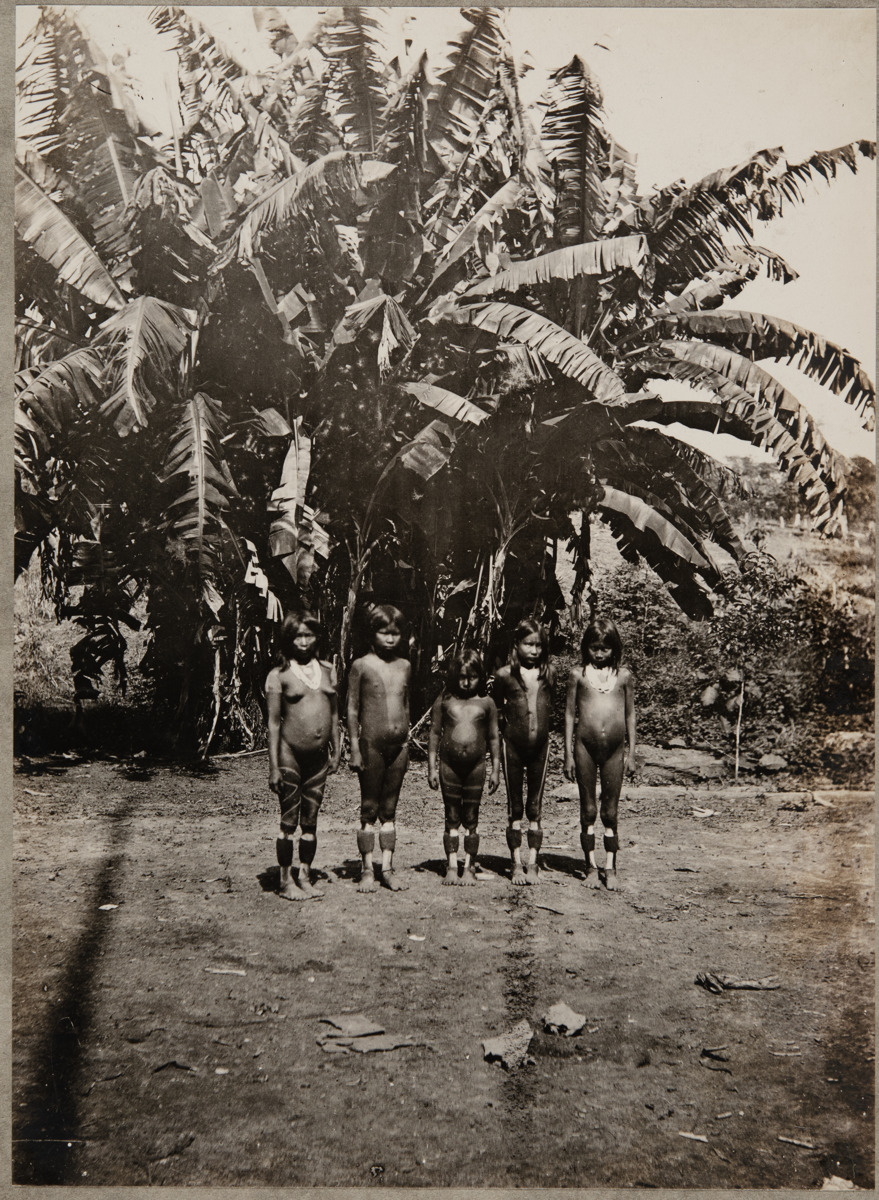
Andoque girls with body painting.

Andoque (or Andoke) are an Indigenous people in Colombia. They live along the Aduche tributary of the Japurá River. The people refer to themselves as Pʌʌsiʌʌ́ hʌ, meaning ‘People of the Axe’.

== Language and culture ==
The Andoque language is a language isolate and is extinct in Peru. The culture values "sacred plants" and a ritual called "Yuruparí." The "Yuruparí" ritual concerns their transcendent vision of cosmology. The Yuruparí ritual makes men initiates "die" then be "reborn" as members of the tribe.

== Religion and oral history ==
The various bee species originated from the nasal bone of Heron-of-the-Center when he was consumed by fire while wearing a jaguar-skin. Tapirs of various colors originated from "the star people, who are bees and wasps", when they ate the body of a honey-drinking old man, who "fell into a trap" which had been dug by his own son.
