= Ocaina =

Dyo'xaiya; Ivo'tsa

Total population
- 137 (2012)

Regions with significant populations
- Peru, Colombia

Languages
- Ocaina

The Ocainas are an Amazonian indigenous people of Peru and Colombia, who are today in danger of extinction. There were 176 of them in 2012. They are one of the many Indigenous populations who still speak their original language, being Ocaina, a Witotoan language. In Amazonia, there are only 50 people who still speak Ocaina.

== History ==
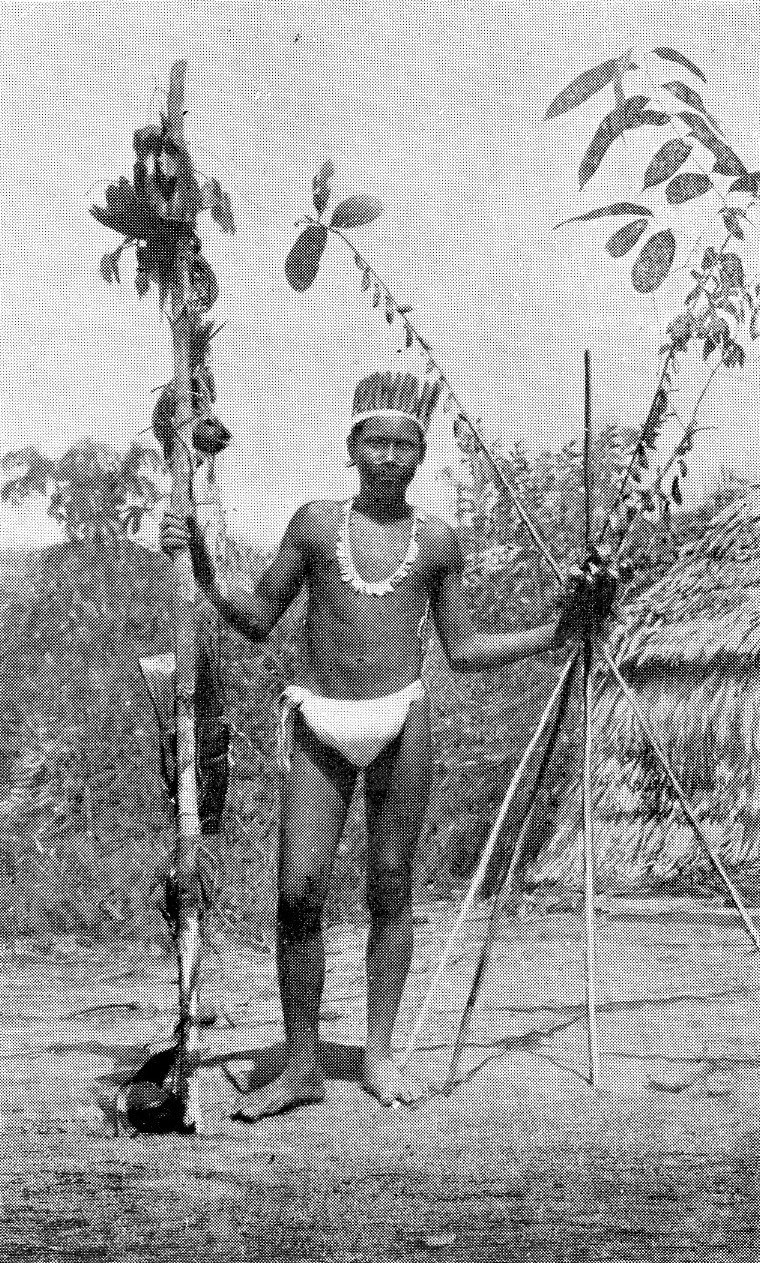
Ocaina chief, 1924

The Ocainas share history and many cultural characteristics with the Huitotos, Resígaros, and Andoques.

At the beginning of the 20th century, Whiffen (1915) estimated the population of the Okaina (Dukaiya) language group at about 2,000. He described them as being in "ceaseless war" with surrounding tribes. Ceremonial body painting (usually with red dye) was a common practice among many indigenous tribes in the Putumayo region, but the Ocainas were particularly well-known for their elaborate patterns.

The Okainas were among the indigenous peoples affected by the Putumayo genocide of the late 19th and early 20th centuries.

== Gallery ==
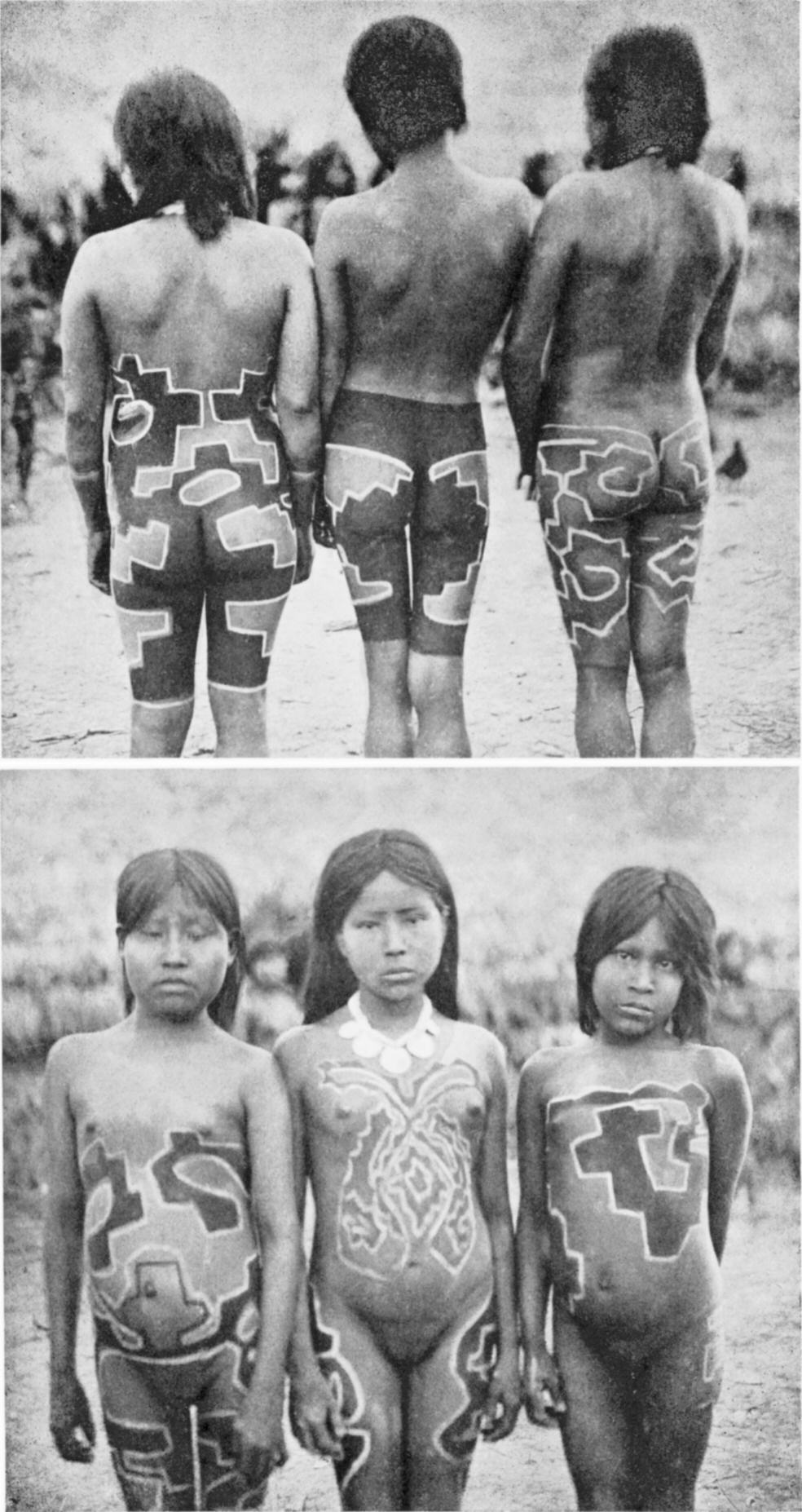
Ocaina girls painted to dance

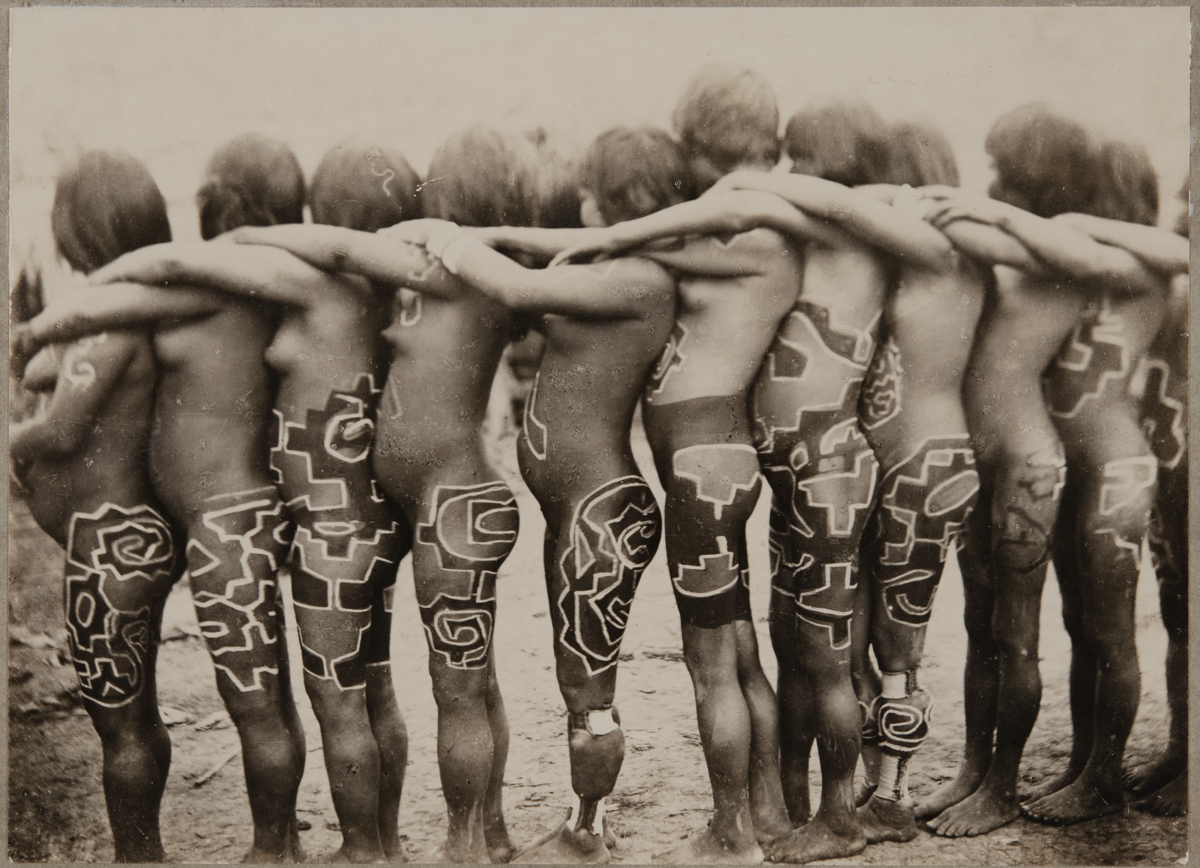
Side view of women's body painting

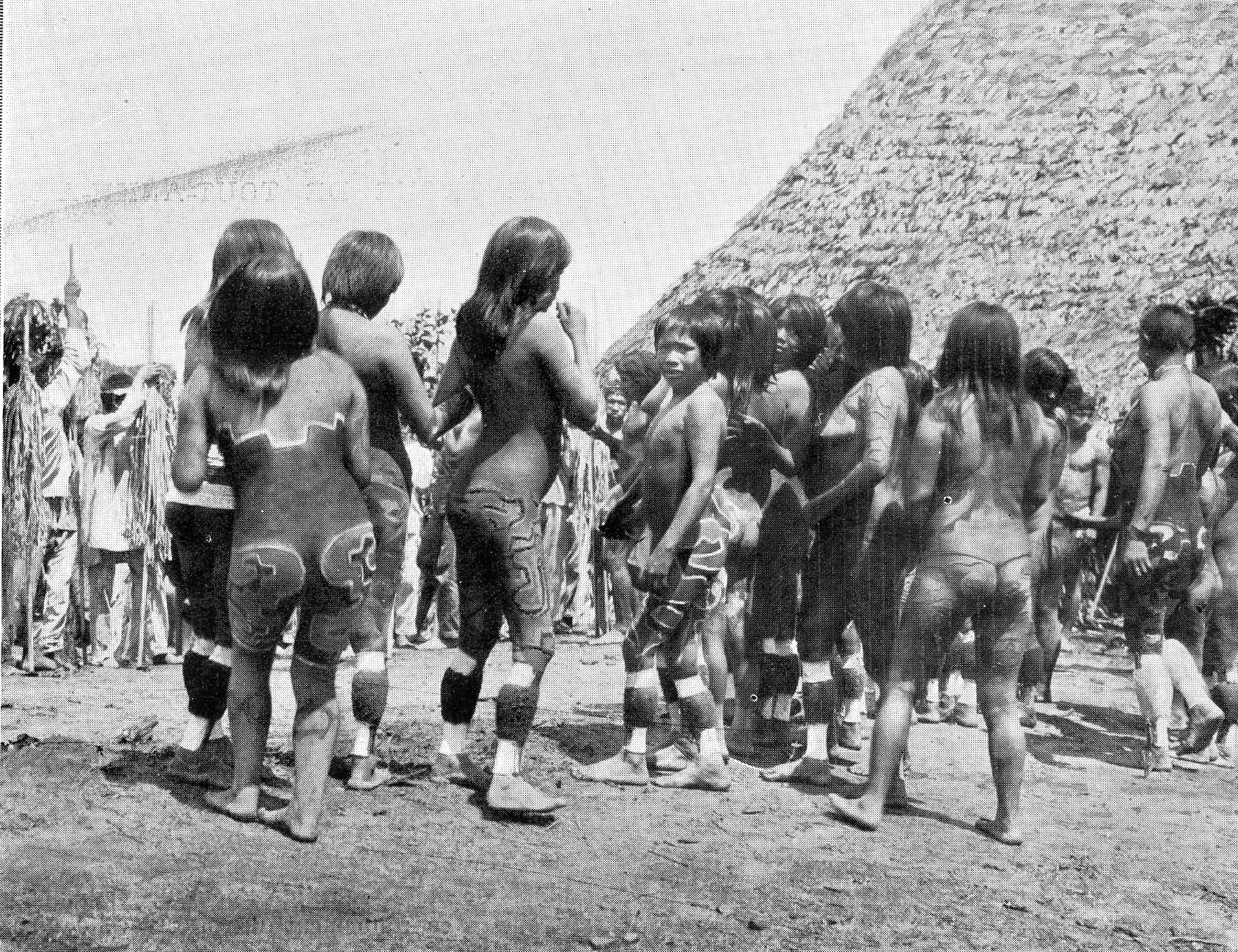
Group of Ocaina women preparing for dancing, 1920s

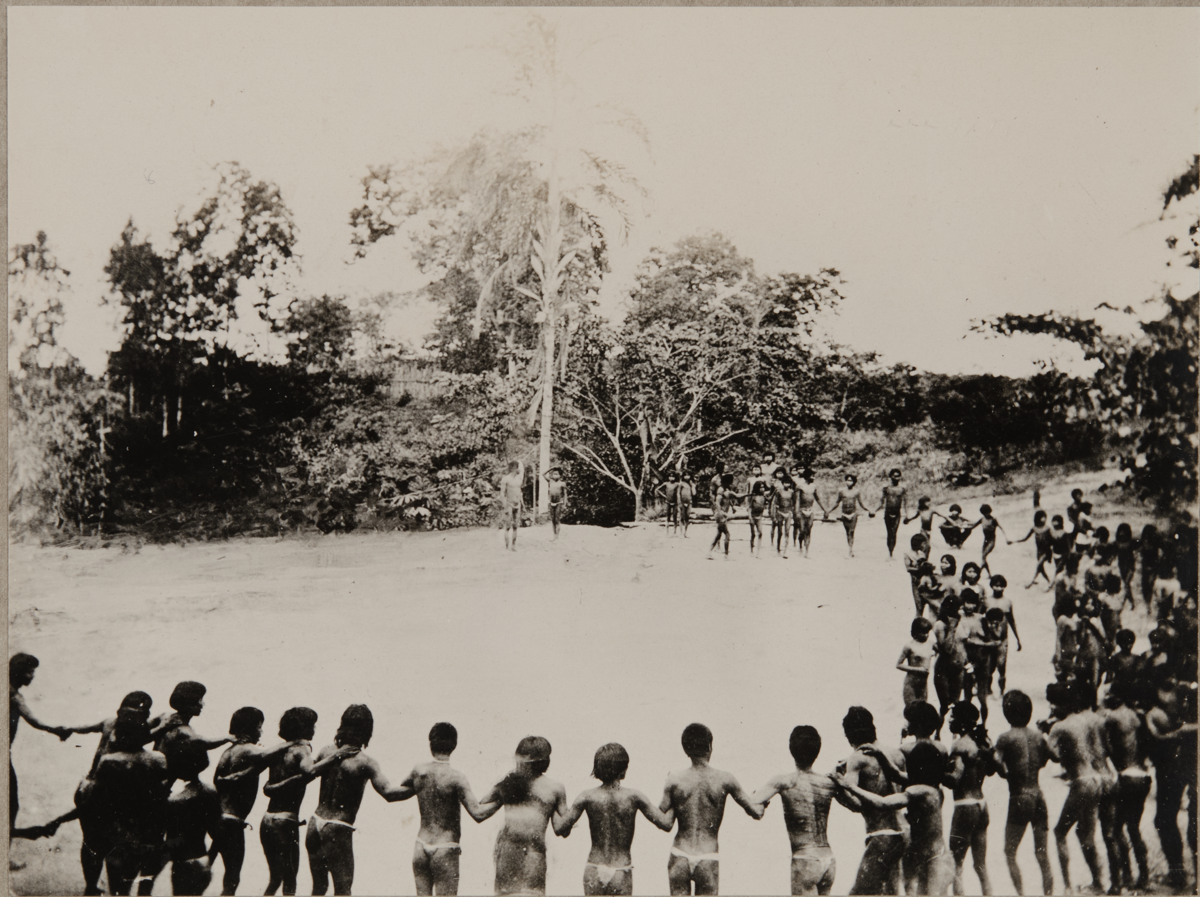
Okaina ceremonial dance

== Bibliography ==
- Blixen, Olaf (1999). Tradiciones ocainas. Buenos Aires: Ciudad Argentina : [Fundación Centro de Estudios Políticos y Administrativos]. ISBN 978-987-507-105-6.
- Valcárcel, Carlos (1915). El proceso del Putumayo y sus secretos inauditos [The Putumayo process and its unprecedented secrets] (in Spanish). Peru / Colombia: The International Work Group for Indigenous Affairs. ISBN 978-9972-9410-9-2.
- Whiffen, Thomas (1915). The north-west Amazons : notes of some months spent among cannibal tribes. New York: Duffield & Co. ISBN 978-1015246713.
