= Ocaina language =

Bora–Huitoto language spoken in South America

Ocaina
- Xáfahxajoh
- Pronunciation: [ˈxaɸaʔxahoʔ]
- Native to: Peru, Colombia
- Ethnicity: Ocaina
- Native speakers: (55 cited 2000–2012)
- Language family: Bora–Huitoto ?: Huitoto–Ocaina; Ocaina
- Dialects: djoʔxáájaʔ; ɯβooʔsa

Language codes
- ISO 639-3: oca
- Glottolog: ocai1244
- ELP: Ocaina
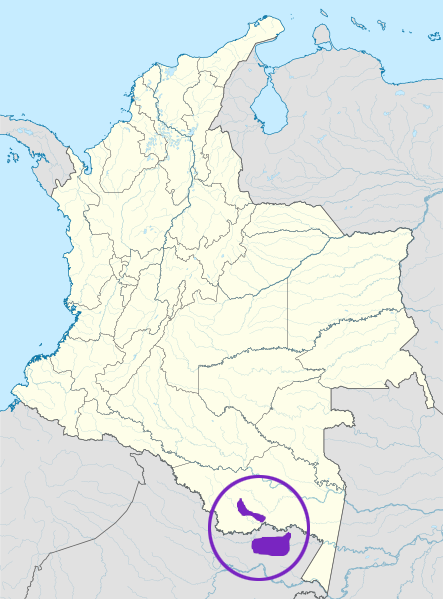

Ocaina is an indigenous American language spoken in western South America.

== Classification ==
Ocaina belongs to the Witotoan language family. It is its own group within the Huitoto-Ocaina sub-family.

== Geographic distribution ==
Ocaina is spoken by 54 people in northeastern Peru and by 12 more in the Amazonas region of Colombia. Few children speak the language.

== Dialects ==
There are two dialects of Ocaina: Dukaiya and Ibo'tsa.

== Phonology ==
=== Consonants ===
Ocaina consonant phonemes
		Bilabial	Alveolar	Postalveolar/ Palatal	Velar	Glottal
Nasal	lenis	m	n	ɲ		
Nasal	fortis	mː	nː	ɲː		
Plosive		p b	t r	tʲ dʲ	k ɡ	ʔ
Affricate			ts dz	tʃ dʒ		
Fricative		ɸ β	s	ʃ ʒ	x	h

=== Vowels ===
Ocaina vowel phonemes
	Front	Central	Back
High	i, ĩ	ɨ, ɨ̃	
Low	e	a, ã	o, õ

=== Tone ===
Syllables in Ocaina may be marked with one of two tones: high or low.

=== Syllables ===
Syllables in Ocaina consist of a vowel; single consonants may appear on either side of the vowel: (C)V(C).

== Writing system ==
Ocaina is written using a Latin alphabet. A chart of symbols with the sounds they represent is as follows:

Latin	IPA
a	/a/
b	/b/
c	/k/ - /ts/
ch	/tʃ/
ds	/dz/
dy	/dʲ/
e	/e/
f	/ɸ/
g(u)	/ɡ/ - /h/
h	/ʔ/
i	/i/
j	/h/
k	/k/
ll	/dʒ/
m	/m/
m̈	/mː/
n	/n/
n̈	/nː/
ñ	/ɲ/
ñ̈	/ɲː/
o	/o/
p	/p/
qu	/k/
r	/r/
s	/s/
sh	/ʃ/
t	/t/
z	/ts/
ty	/tʲ/
u	/ɨ/
v	/β/
x	/x/
y	/ʒ/

- Because the Ocaina alphabet is based on Spanish, c is used to indicate /k/ before a, o, and u, qu is used before e and i, and k is used in loan words, such as kerosene "kerosene".
- Nasalization is indicated by inserting n after a vowel. Compare: tya tyója [tʲa tʲóha] "hang it" vs. tya tyonjan [tʲa tʲṍhã] "clean it".
- High tone is indicated with the acute accent: á, é, í, ó, ú.
