= Miguel S. Loayza =

Peruvian rubber baron

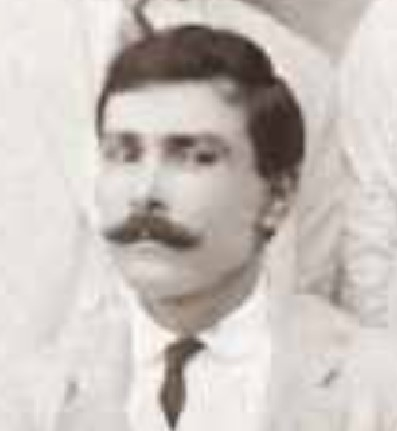
- Miguel S. Loayza, late 1912.

Personal details
- Born: Miguel de los Santos Loayza Pérez

Miguel S. Loayza (c.1870 – 1960s) was a manager of the Peruvian Amazon Company at its El Encanto headquarters. Benjamin Saldaña Rocca included Loayza in his original criminal petition against eighteen members of the company for atrocious crimes. The criminal petition indicted Loayza and the others with fraud, robbery, rape and aggravated murder. Judge Carlos A. Válcarcel and Walter Ernest Hardenburg implicated Loayza with an incident in 1907 that result in the massacre of multiple Colombians. Ultimately, Miguel was never prosecuted for his role in the incident, or any involvement with the Putumayo genocide.

The Peruvian Amazon Company was liquidated in 1913, and in the process Loayza managed to retain some property. He also kept a portion of the company's workforce, which depended on natives trapped in debt peonage. In reality, the debt peonage relationship was equivalent to slavery. Before the transfer of the Putumayo from Peru to Colombia, Loayza and Julio César Arana organized a series of forced migrations deeper into Peru: with the intention of retaining their work force. The migration further hurt the indigenous of the Putumayo, with many dying from disease while the survivors continued to be exploited for Miguel's financial gain. It's believed that Loayza died during the 1960s, somewhere into his nineties near Iquitos.

== Early life ==
There is very little information about Miguel S. Loayza's early life. By the late 1880s Miguel was already in the Ampiyacu basin dealing in rubber with his brother Carlos Loayza. They owned a port on the river, which they forbid anyone from passing. In 1889, Julio César Arana moved to Iquitos with his brother-in-laws to expand their peddling business, and their foothold in the rubber industry. Iquitos was the biggest exporter of rubber at the time in the region and regional exporters like Miguel S. Loayza had to transport their product to Iquitos if they wanted to export. At some point between the 1890s-1903, Loayza joined his rubber extracting enterprise with Arana's company. A document by the Lima Geographic Society referred to him as a customs agent in 1901, and he was likely working with Arana by this time: as the document details him travelling from La Chorrera to the Caraparaná river. La Chorrera belonged to other rubber exporters that had a business relationship with Arana.

== In the Putumayo ==
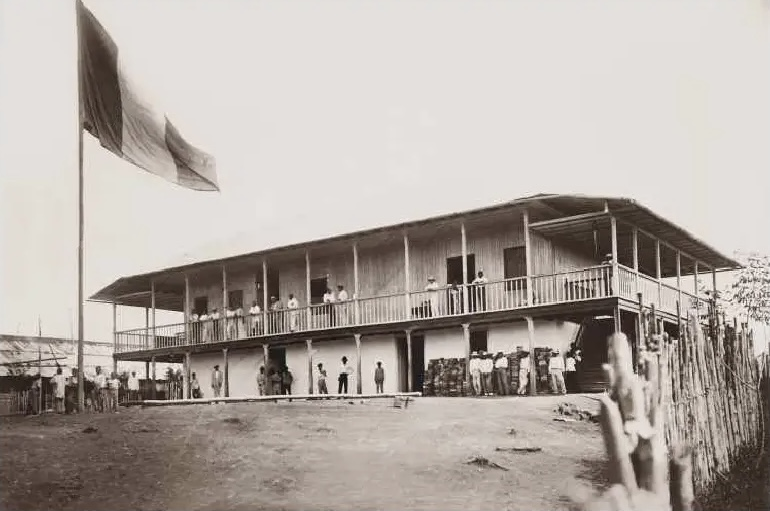
The main house at El Encanto, belonging to Loayza

Miguel and his brother Carlos Loayza were instrumental members of the companies staff. There is not a lot written about their early time in the Putumayo. One first hand account placed Miguel at the September 24, 1903 massacre of 25 Ocaina natives, however his involvement in unclear. Miguel was listed in a document that dated between 1903 and 1906 by Eugene Robuchon as an employee at a substation of El Encanto named La Florida. Around 1905, Miguel became the manager of El Encanto, a settlement at the mouth of the Caraparaná River. Rubber produced by stations along the river was sent later sent to El Encanto, and from there to Iquitos. The settlement of El Encanto was the regional headquarters for the company, and had at least 10 substations. During this time period, El Encanto had around 55 white staff members that answered to Loayza. The white staff and Barbadians employed by the company managed the native workfroce. Natives from the Witoto, Bora, Andoque, and Ocaina tribes were enslaved in the areas around Encanto. The men of these tribes were sent into the jungles to collect rubber for long periods of time. If one did not meet a weight quota required by the company manager, the guilty person could be tortured, and or executed. During the Putumayo genocide, Loayza and other managers of Arana's company were paid on a commission for the rubber collected at their station. There was a financial incentive to exploit the natives, and in the pursuit of having rubber collected there was incentive to instill terror.

=== Involvement with the 1907 incident ===
When Walter Ernest Hardenburg came to the Putumayo in 1907, there were only three significant Colombian settlements left in the region. The Peruvian Amazon Company had previously absorbed or destroyed up to around forty settlements through manipulation of force. In one incident, Miguel S. Loayza instigated the killing of a Colombian named Faustino Hernandez, which owned a plantation named Esperanza. Hernandez apparently came to Encanto to protest the sale of the property from Colombian to Peruvian hands. While Hardenburg was traveling through the region, to Iquitos, he met David Serrano. Serrano owed a 'small sum' of money to Miguel Loayza: who used this as an excuse to send a 'commission' to his property. Members of this group chained David to a tree, before they dragged his wife out of their house and raped her. After taking the rubber from Serrano's establishment, the 'commission' took his wife and child aboard the boat. David later found out his wife was forced to become a concubine to Miguel, while his son served as a servant to Miguel.

This event caught the attention of the Colombian government, who sent Jesús Orjuela, a police inspector to the region to investigate: and set up a meeting with Loayza at El Dorado. El Dorado was one of the last Colombian settlements in the area. When Jesús arrived, he expressed confidence that some sort of agreement or concession could be made with Loayza and the company. Hardenburg decided to follow Orjuela. Miguel never showed up to the meeting, on the way back to Serrano's establishment they were then arrested on January 12. Earlier that day, the ships Iquitos and Liberal attacked La Reserva, which was the settlement of Serrano. Soldiers that were aboard those two ships looted, then burned La Reserva. La Union was a Colombian settlement owned by the company Ordoñez and Martinez. Loayza took the children, women, native workers, and employees of Ordoñez for the company The settlements of La Union and La Reserva were destroyed, while Loayza robbed El Dorado and threatened the Colombians. Hardenburg later found out that David Serrano and 28 members of his Colombian staff were massacred. His friend, Walter Perkins relayed: "They not only shot them to death, but horribly mutilated their bodies with their machetes and threw them into the river."

Years later, Roger Casement interviewed a native pilot who worked on the Liberal and witnessed the event. The native stated Loayza was also on the Liberal, which had started shooting before the Colombians and Peruvian soldiers. Contemporary documents imply that Loayza orchestrated the events against the Colombians in 1907, however do not clarify if Loayza acted under orders or independently. There were no more competitors for the Peruvian company after the 1907 incident, effectively granting them full control of the Putumayo.

Due to their treatment on the Liberal, as well as being witnesses to crimes against the Colombians, Hardenburg and Perkins were convinced they would be murdered. Hardenburg protested against their arrest to Loayza, who explained the imprisonment was for their own good: stating the Colombians would surely have murdered them. For their own safety, they lied to Miguel, stating that they worked for an American company who wanted to invest in the region. They were taken to El Encanto where they were imprisoned and spent the night on the floor. Hardenburg asked to see Loayza the next morning, and confronted Loayza about his intentions, insisting that if they disappeared, their American employers were certain to investigate. Therefore, any harm that came to them could have potential political repercussions. Loayza told Hardenburg that he could leave on the Liberal, which was going to travel to Iquitos with the Colombian rubber. When Hardenburg reached the port of Iquitos, he witnessed the condition of the natives that were going to unload the stolen rubber.

"Another edifying spectacle that we witnessed was the condition of the poor Indians who loaded and unloaded the vessels that stopped at the port. There were from fifty to sixty of these unfortunates, so weak, debilitated, and scarred that many of them could hardly walk. It was a pitiful sight to see these poor Indians, practically naked, their bones almost protruding through their skins, and all branded with the infamous marca de Arana, staggering up the steep hill, carrying upon their doubled backs enormous weights of merchandise for the consumption of their miserable oppressors."

— Walter E. Hardenburg, "The Putumayo, The Devil's Paradise",

=== Role in the Putumayo genocide ===
Hardenburg wrote about his experiences in the Putumayo a few years after he left the region, primarily referring to his time on the Liberal and at El Encanto. Along with other revelations, he noted that Miguel kept an involuntary harem of around thirteen girls, ranging from ages nine to sixteen. Hardenburg noted: "This band of unfortunates was composed of some thirteen young girls...too young to be called women—were the helpless victims of Loayza and the other chief officials of the Peruvian Amazon Company's El Encanto branch, who violated these tender children without the slightest compunction, and when they tired of them either murdered them or flogged them and sent them back to their tribes." Another scene Hardenburg witnessed at Encanto were some natives lying down sick and dying. "These poor wretches, without remedies, without food, were exposed to the burning rays of the vertical sun and the cold rains and heavy dews of early morning until death released them from their sufferings." After the sick native finally died out, their body was carried and interred into the Caraparaná river.

Hardenburg's book was greatly benefited from the work of Benjamin Saldaña Rocca, who was a journalist that helped expose the company's actions. Saldaña filed a criminal petition against eighteen members of the Peruvian Amazon Company, including Loayza. He implicated Loayza and the other employees as perpetrators of the following crimes: fraud, robbery, arson, rape, aggravated homicide, torturing by fire, water, whips, and mutilations. To further their work, Saldana and Hardenburg separately collected first hand accounts from ex-employees of the company. Three of these first hand accounts directly implicated Loayza with the knowledge of the crimes around El Encanto, and that Loayza had ordered some of the crimes in the first place.

One of the first hand account collected by Hardenburg and used in his book, comes from Carlos Soplín. Soplín swore before a public notary that at times after natives are flogged, they were then killed by a chain that is tied around their neck. This happened under the orders of Loayza when the native did not bring enough rubber to meet a quota. Soplín also implicated a section inspector who worked under Loayza at the Esmeraldas station. During that inspector's time as a subchief of El Encanto, Soplin believed over 5,000 natives were flogged. Roger Casement later estimated that Loayza earned around £2,500 a year based on commission from rubber profits.

Genaro Caporo also swore before a public notary, and referred to Loayza as a monster. Caporo described one instance where a Colombian was taken to El Encanto as a prisoner, and executed by a Barbadian on Loayza's orders. The Colombians body was then thrown into the river. The Barbadian, named King, is said to have committed other murders under the orders of Loayza. Roger Casement describes this Barbadian as "clearly a villain and in Loayza's pay as a "confidential agent."" Casement avoided interviewing King in depth, believing that King would either lie to protect himself, or could have been bribed by Loayza. In the short interview, King stated that in an instance of self defense, Loayza ordered the Colombian to be shot. Caporo concluded his statement by stating: "All these deeds occur with great frequency in the Putumayo." After the killing of the Colombian man, Soplin said a 'great feast' was held to celebrate the "graces, valour, and courage of the assassins." Caporo does not name the Colombian man, but Soplin identifies him as Faustino Hernandez. Hernandez's plantation was absorbed into Encanto's territory.

=== Role in the company's liquidation ===
Liquidation of the company effectively removed any jurisdiction the British government could have had over the natives, or control over the criminals. Roger Casement's 1910 investigation was only allowed to take place because Barbadians (English subjects) were employed by the company, and the company was registered in England. Casement's feelings on the matter were described as such: "when the company breaks up... they may exploit the last rubber trees and last Indians to their private profit." The Putumayo genocide devasted the local indigenous populations, whose labor was the real source of profit for the Peruvian Amazon Company. As well as exhausting the supply of rubber trees near company plantations, the company exhausted their supply of native workers. Miguel Loayza had been active in the Putumayo region since the earliest stages of the genocide, working with Julio César Arana as early as 1901 and dealing in rubber since the late 1880s. The abusive, often fatal methods of inducing the natives to collect rubber for El Encanto and its substations, before, as well as during Loayza's management, were severely detrimental to the native population and decimated their numbers.

After the exposure of the companies actions in the Putumayo by Hardenburg and Casement, managers Juan Tizon and Miguel Loayza managed a series of reforms. Miguel Loayza is said to have abolished the pay by commission system at El Encanto in January 1911. A large portion of the companies staff was also replaced. New orders were given by Tizon and Loayza to ensure that each tribe had plantations for food which the extractive operation did not allow them to cultivate prior to liquidation. When asked about the decline in population at El Encanto over the past five years, Miguel blamed smallpox. Charles Roberts inquired about a letter dated June 10, 1909 from Miguel Loayza, and read its contents out loud to Julio Cesar Arana. Loayza wrote "to deal with the Indians who run away we are now sending three double-barreled guns." Arana stated he did not understand their purpose, but said they were likely given to the natives in exchange for rubber. In an English parliament session, Neil Malcolm inquired if Loayza was present at the La Reserva raid, and if his arrest would be pursued. Sir Edward Grey confirmed that was the same Loayza, however stated the English government had no present grounds to pursue an arrest. This was due to a recent consular report (not by Casement) stating Loayza introduced reforms that had "the most satisfactory results, and that great credit is due to him on this account."

=== Information collected by Judge Valcárcel regarding Miguel ===
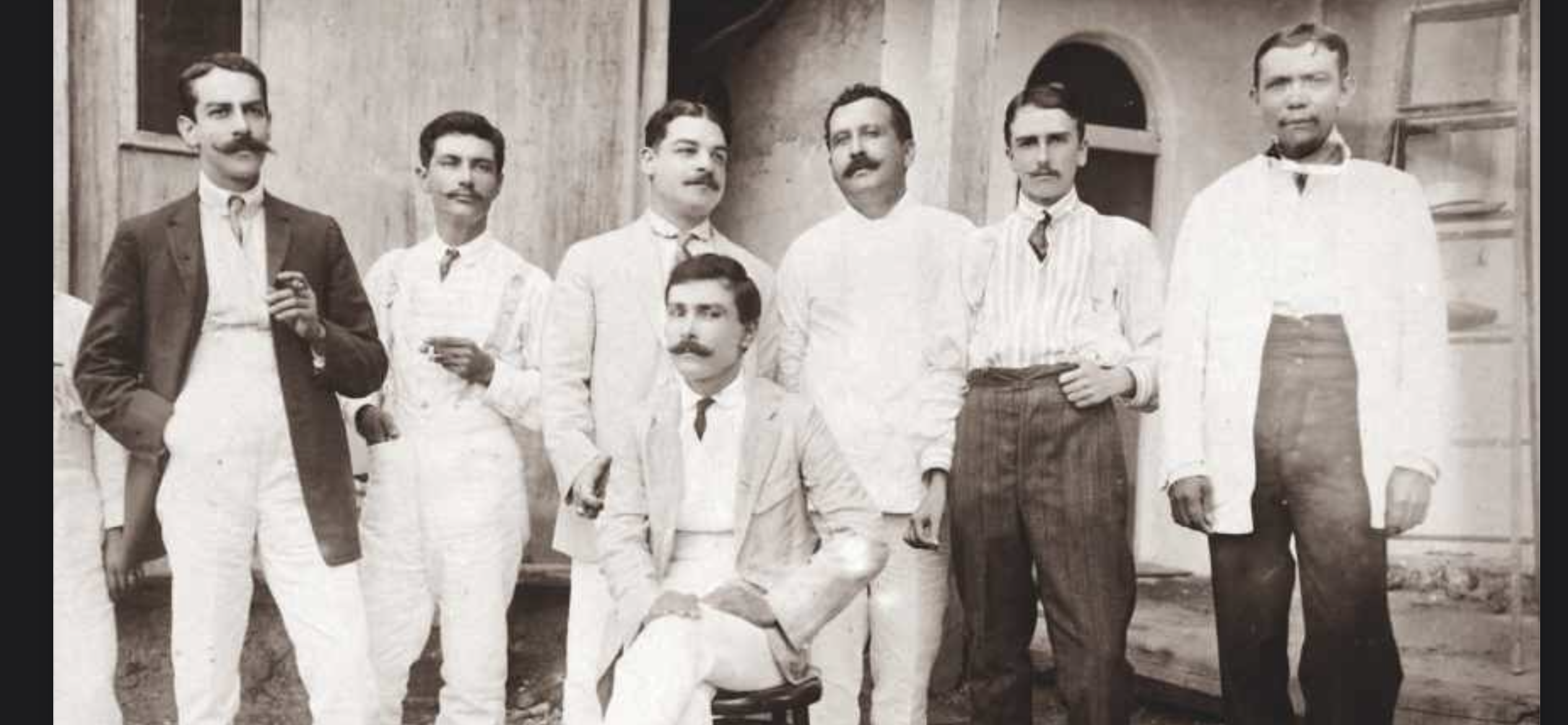
The administrators of La Chorrera, with their boss Miguel S. Loayza

Judge Carlos A. Valcárcel entered the Putumayo to collect evidence and further investigate the atrocities in 1914. The judge conducted criminal proceedings at several of the plantations that delivered to El Encanto and Loayza, notably the Argelia and La Florida stations. Valcárcel published a book with his research a year later, in it he stated "Loayza is very cautious, and has always tried not to leave traces of his participation in the crimes of the Putumayo, taking meticulous precautions for that purpose." Valcárcel cited written letters and first hand accounts detailing activities around El Encanto to disprove Miguel's innocence. One statement collected by Valcárcel from Victor Macedo, placed Loyaza at the September 24, 1903 massacre of 25 Ocaina natives, which happened at La Chorrera. It is unspecified to what extent Loayza participated. One letter came from a Peruvian military captain, and according to Valcárcel its contents left no doubt to the participation of Loayza in the 1907 incident with the Colombians. Another letter collected by the judge revealed that Loayza had knowledge about the treatment and condition of the natives in the sections that delivered rubber to him. The letter was written by Loayza to another plantation manager, discussing potential excursions to enslave more workers. Other statements attested to abuse on the stations that delivered rubber to Loayza at El Encanto.

Valcárcel collected a lot of evidence against the Company itself, and in Iquitos he attempted to make arrest warrants against their employees stick. However, the judge was forced to leave the city when Arana's arrest warrant instigated a riot. The High Court in Iquitos dismissed the arrest warrant a month later on the grounds that they were too vague. In 1915 Valcárcel published a book containing evidence implicating Loayza and the Peruvian Amazon company with crimes. However, no further criminal proceedings were pursued.

== Later life ==
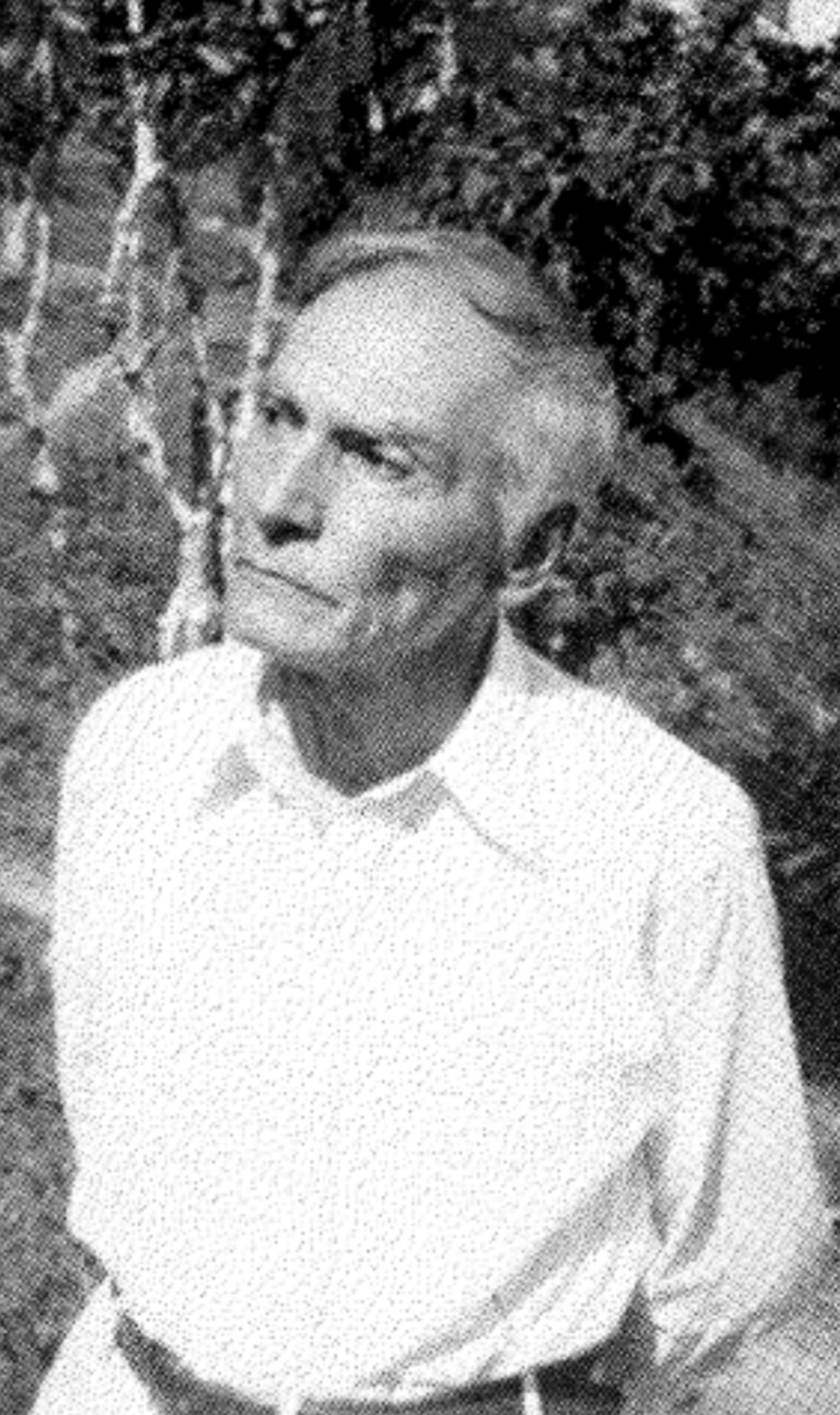
Loayza during the 1950s

After the scandal of the Putumayo genocide and the liquidation of the company, the Loayza brothers remained administrators at El Encanto, presiding over a native work force. Before the border change and transition of the Putumayo from Peru to Colombia occurred: Miguel and his brother Carlos organized a series of forced migrations. These occurred in two different stages, the first waves beginning in the 1920s, and the last in 1932 after the Colombia-Peru War. This was done under the guise of patriotism, and for 'the importance of the country.' The conflict between Colombia and Peru was financially disastrous for the Loayzas who had to abandon some property and make new investments towards the migrations and workforce.

At least 6,719 natives from the Huitoto, Bora, Andoque, and Ocaina populations were forced to relocate deeper into Peru so the Loayzas could retain their workforce. According to Carlos Loayza, 50% of these people died off from disease. Settling in the Ampiyacu basin of Loreto, where the Loayzas owned an official land concession, they used the natives to build a 'fundo' enterprise. Fundos were characterized as extractive posts of forest products, including rubber. The native groups were divided and spread throughout the basin, the Ocaina at Puerto Izango, the Huitoto with Carlos Loayza at Pucaurquillo, among other places.

The explorer Romain Wilhelmsen and convicted Nazi war criminal Hermann Becker-Freyseng met Loayza in the mid 1950s. Becker-Freyseng was cordial with Miguel Loayza and introduced the explorer. Wilhelmsen interviewed the aged Miguel for a book he was writing, and also took some film. Romain found out that Loayza was still active in the exploitation of rubber, noting: "huge balls of dark gray latex were piled up beneath his veranda ready for shipment." Becker identified some of the natives that they seen on the way to meet Miguel, as Boros(Boras) natives. According to Becker, "Many of them are the sons and grandsons of the Boros who worked with him during the rubber days."

In the early 1950s Wesley Thiesen, who was a missionary, moved to the Ampiyacu basin with his wife. The couple later started a school and was responsible for a wave of first generation indigenous teachers. The Thiesens both struggled against the Loayza brothers and managed to secure a land concession controlled by the Thiesans and the natives. It wasn't until the 1960s that the Loayzas were forced to leave the region and the natives gained further autonomy. Loayza died in the 1960s, somewhere in his nineties.
