= La Chorrera =

La Chorrera can refer to:

- La Chorrera, Colombia, town in Amazonas Department, Colombia
- La Chorrera, Panama, city in Panama
- La Chorrera District, district containing that city
