= Victor Macedo =

Peruvian Amazon Company administrator

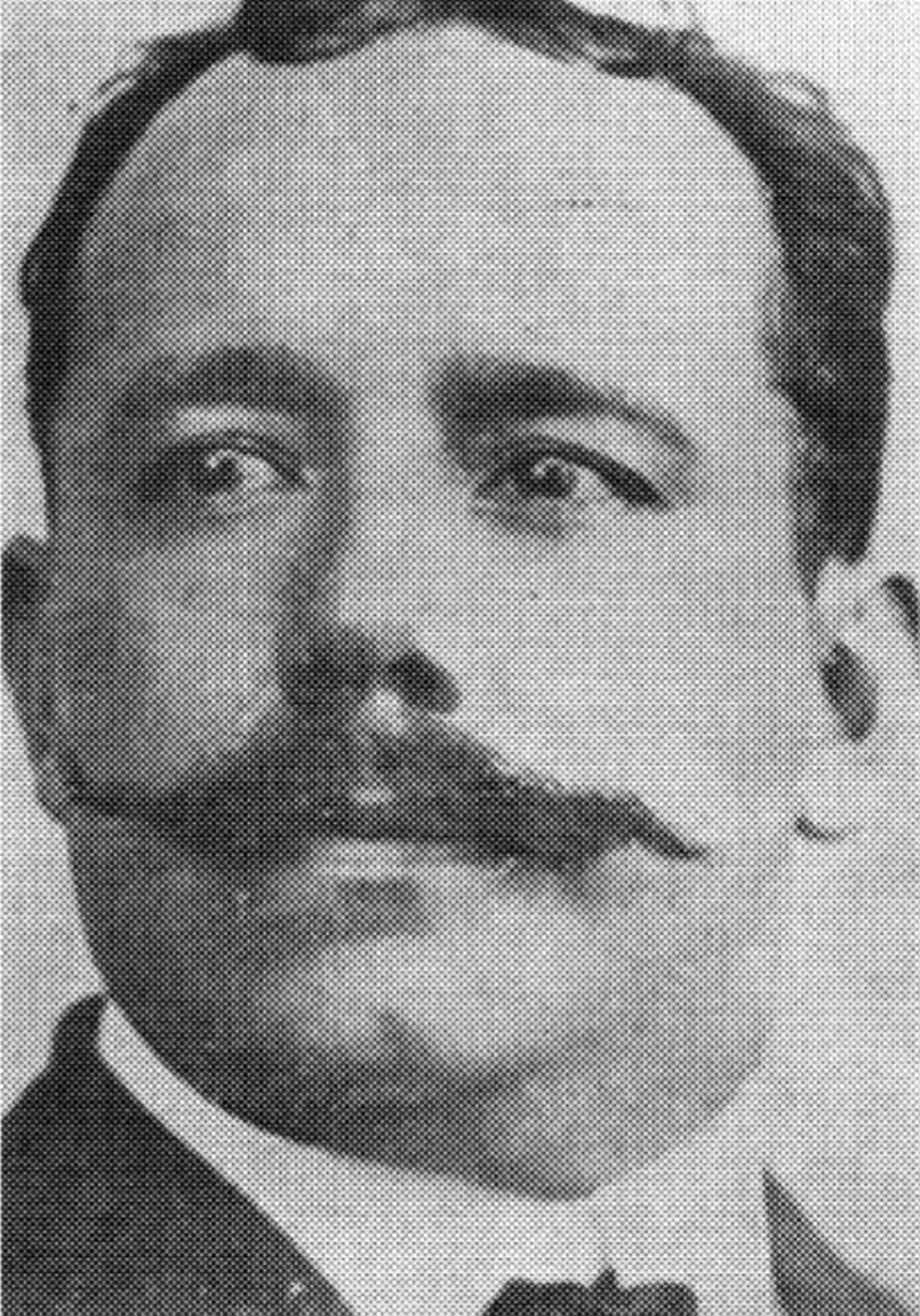
- Photograph of Victor Macedo c. 1915
- Born: Victor Macedo
- Occupation: General manager for the Peruvian Amazon Company

Victor Macedo was a Peruvian administrator involved in the operations of the Peruvian Amazon Company during the early 20th century. Between 1903 and 1911, Macedo held a leadership role at La Chorrera, a major rubber station in the Putumayo region, a remote area infamous for the exploitation and abuse of indigenous peoples during the rubber boom. He became a central figure in the Putumayo genocide, a series of atrocities that saw the enslavement, torture, and mass killing of indigenous groups by rubber barons seeking to maximize profits from rubber extraction.

Macedo's role in the atrocities, along with that of his employer, Julio César Arana, has been widely documented, with multiple reports and investigations implicating him in forced labor, starvation, and brutal punishments. These actions were part of broader company practices incentivized by commission-based payments, leading to widespread human rights abuses under Macedo's management.

Arrest warrants were issued for Macedo and other company officials following investigations into the atrocities, particularly those conducted by British diplomat Roger Casement. However, despite being briefly arrested, Macedo evaded significant legal consequences, partly due to political influence and corruption within Peru, and his later whereabouts remain uncertain. He later fled to Bolivia and continued his involvement in rubber extraction, escaping further prosecution.

== Role in the Putumayo genocide ==
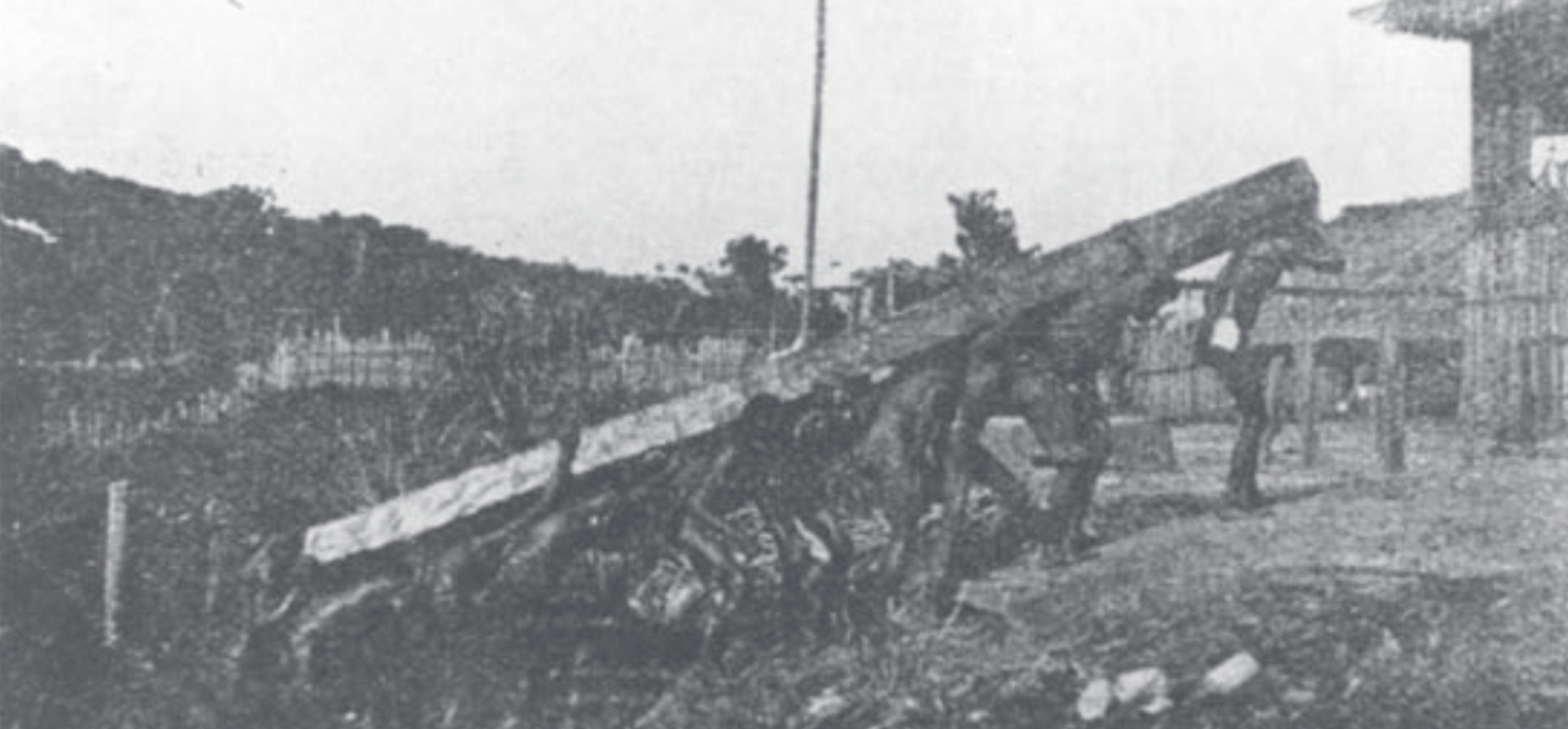
Indigenous Witoto workers at one of La Chorrera's rubber stations, photograph circa 1906.

Julio César Arana and his rubber firm employed Victor Macedo as an administrator at La Chorrera, Colombia, during the Putumayo genocide. The rubber firms that controlled La Chorrera were dependent on an enslaved workforce to extract raw rubber, which would then be sent to the port at La Chorrera. Years before the Peruvian Amazon Company came into existence, rubber patrons like Macedo would expand their workforce by trading metal tools like axes or machetes for a year of work or a ten-year-old child. Another method frequently employed at La Chorrera's agency were correrías, slave raids in which many natives were either captured or killed. Macedo organized several of these correrías between 1903-1910. According to Pedro Flores speaking in 1975, while at La Chorerra, Macedo implemented the weight quota of rubber that was imposed against the native workforce. (Note: This information comes from a man named Pedro Flores, who was born near the Cahuinari River, and he was interviewed in 1974.) During Macedo's management, the agency at La Corerra exploited indigenous groups, including Huitotos, Andoques, Ocaina, Yurias, Resígaro and Boras.

Macedo was implicated in a massacre of Ocaina natives at La Chorrera in 1903; this incident became the subject of a criminal complaint journalist Benjamin Saldaña Rocca filed, which eventually led to the issuing of more than 215 arrest warrants against employees of the La Chorrera' agency in the Putumayo River basin. In July 1911, judge Carlos A. Valcárcel issued an arrest warrant against Macedo for his role in the atrocities that occurred in the Putumayo between 1903 and 1911 under his management.

Rómulo Paredes, a judge who investigated the Putumayo genocide in 1911, believed the first massacres in the region began under Larrañaga's leadership and continued under Macedo's administration. In the ninth chapter of his 1915 book El Proceso del Putumayo y sus secretos, Valcarcel examines the culpability of Macedo, Arana, Pablo Zumaeta and Juan B. Vega for the conditions in the region, the evidence collected by the 1911 commission that incriminates the senior managers with the atrocities, and Paredes's explanation for why they were not prosecuted. Paredes became convinced crimes in the Putumayo were committed with Macedo's knowledge and approval, and that Macedo had personally perpetrated crimes and abuse against the natives.

The British Foreign Office sent diplomat Roger Casement to investigate the role of Barbadian men employed at La Chorrera in the atrocities in the Putumayo and reports of abuse against Barbadians. Macedo organized multiple armed excursions against Colombians and natives during his management of the agency. Barbadian men took part in several of these raids and later gave depositions to Casement reporting crimes they had witnessed and perpetrated against the natives. (Note: Daniel Collantes gave a deposition on information regarding a raid ordered by Macedo towards the Caqueta River. Armando Normand led a raid against Colombians on the Caqueta in 1906, and Jimenez led another one in 1910.) Casement interviewed thirty Barbadians, many of whom had worked around the La Chorrera agency for years; two of them told Casement Macedo was aware of the crimes occurring in the region. (Note: Hardenburg wrote: "Macedo is the chief of all the employees in this territory, and has the power of employing or discharging men, the fixing of salaries, &c.; and it is with the knowledge, consent, and approval of this wretch that these incredible crimes are carried out. This torturer and assassin is the justice of the peace of the Putumayo.") Casement wrote: "Macedo was one of Arana's longest serving Chiefs of Section and had an established history of brutality".

The Peruvian Amazon Company paid Macedo and the managers based on how much rubber was collected in their respective sections. Casement believed the company paid Macedo around £2,000–£3,500 annually, and possibly more. According to the payroll at La Chorrera in 1910, Macedo's salary was £30 a month along with a commission of six percent on the profit made from his agency. Hardenburg said the company paying its employees by a commission incentivized them to collect and export as much rubber as possible in a short time, and this could either be done by paying the natives or terrorizing them into submission. He said because Arana's company did not believe in paying natives for their labor, the "rule of terror" had been applied throughout the company's estate. (Note: Hardenburg continues: "[t]hose who have studied the history of the Congo will see here precisely the same conditions which produced such lamentable results in the Belgian companies' sphere of operations".)

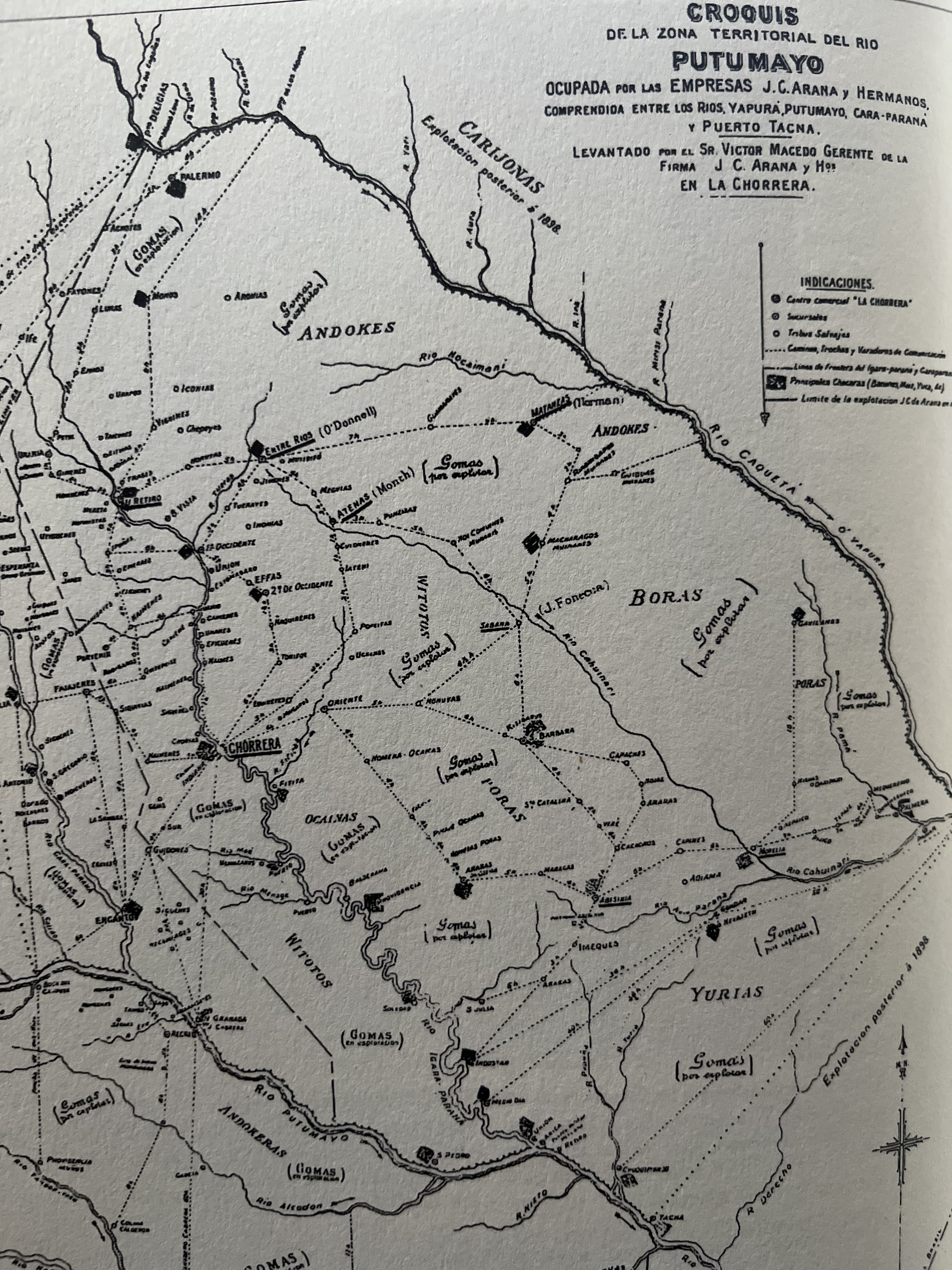
Map of the J.C Arana y Hermanos estate between the Igara-Paraná and Caqueta Rivers

Paredes made a similar conclusion to Hardenburg regarding commissions paid to the managers. He believed these contracts incentivized the managers to exploit and extort natives into collecting as much rubber as possible in a short time. Indigenous men, women, children and elderly people were compelled to work for Arana's firm, and were subjected to cruel punishment or death when they failed to meet the obligations imposed upon them. Paredes wrote: "[h]unger has been perhaps the most terrible scourge which has fallen on the Putumayo" and that station chiefs did not allow natives enough time to cultivate food to sustain themselves.

In 1906, during Macedo's management, there were around forty stations between the Igara-Paraná River and the Caqueta River that delivered rubber to La Chorrera. The natives under La Chorrera's agency suffered systematic starvation during Macedo's administration. Several of Chorrera's stations suffered from famine due to the conditions imposed by the managers, notably at the stations at Atenas, Matanzas, Abisinia (Note: The last deposition collected by Casement in 1910 stated: "John Brown saw many Indians, women and men, who were starved to death, who died by hunger while kept chained up and in the 'cepo' at Abisinia."), and Ultimo Retiro. The managers Elias Martinengui and Armando Normand both gave their natives little-to-no time to cultivate food. (Note: "Atenas, a district formerly sacked and wasted by its chief of section, Elias Martinengui and later by Alfredo Montt, where the Indians had been so ruthlessly driven, man, woman, and child, to produce rubber for these insatiable agents that they had literally starved to death by whole tribes in the midst of possible fertility, because not allowed a moment's breathing space to prepare the soil or plant any crop.") While at Entre Rios in 1910, Casement wrote in his journal: "Macedo is alleged to have said: 'The Indians are not here to plant chacaras [(food gardens)]. They are here to get rubber.'" Saldaña Rocca, Casement, Hardenburg and Paredes had also collected information on several cases at La Chorrera where starvation was used as a means for capital punishment. The use of cepos, a device similar to a pillory, was reported at La Chorrera, Matanzas, Entre Rios, Atenas, Ultimo Retiro, Abisinia, Occidente, Santa Catalina and other stations that were under Macedo's administration.

At the end of a list titled "Names of the worst criminals on the Putumayo when I was there", Casement wrote: "All the above were chiefs of section ie. principal agents in full authority over a certain district acting under the general supervision of Victor Macedo—the principal agent at La Chorrera". (Note: The list is as follows: Fidel Velarde, Alfredo Montt, Augusto Jiménez, Armando Normand, Jose Inocente Fonseca, Abelardo Aguero, Elias Martinengui, and Aurelio Rodriguez. This list of names follows the "Black List received 25 May from Mr Barnes".)

== J.C. Arana y Hermanos ==
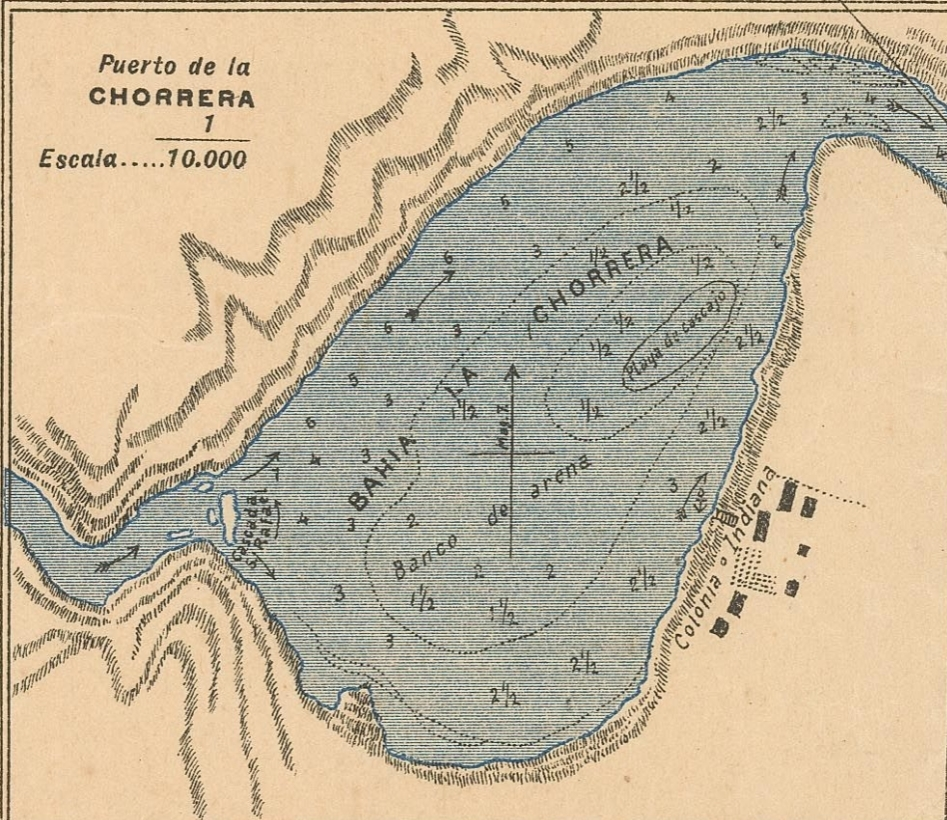
"Port of La Chorrera" by Enrique Espinar, circa 1902.

The date on which Victor Macedo arrived in the Putumayo region is unknown. Macedo was working with the Larrañaga family and Julio César Arana (Note: Benjamin and Rafael Larrañaga were some of the earliest Colombian colonizers of the Putumayo, arriving in the region sometime between 1884-1895. Arana, a rubber baron, entered the region in 1896 and soon established several partnerships with Colombians in the area, including the Larrañagas.) as early as 1903 at an important settlement located below a waterfall named "Colonia Indiana", which was later known as La Chorrera. In 1903, Arana hired French explorer Eugène Robuchon to map his estate in the Putumayo; a map of this territory is shown in Robuchon's book En el Putumayo, y Sus Afluentes, where it is written that the map was drawn up for Macedo, manager of the J.C. Arana y Hermanos firm at La Chorrera. The founder of La Chorrera, Benjamin Larrañaga, died at La Chorrera on December 22, 1903, and Arana acquired Rafael Larrañaga's share of the estate shortly afterward . Juan B. Vega and Arana continued their partnership and established Arana, Vega y Compania, which employed Macedo as a manager at La Chorrera.

In late 1904, the first group of Barbadian men hired by Arana's firm arrived at La Chorrera and were dispatched from La Chorrera on November 17, 1904, to establish the station at Matanzas near the Caqueta River in a territory inhabited by the indigenous Andoque people. (Note: Roger Casement believed the distance between La Chorrera and Matanzas was about 70 miles (110 km). The date for the Barbadians leaving Chorrera on November 17 1904 comes from Westerman Leavine, one of the original members of this group.) There were twenty-five Barbadian men and ten other men of different nationalities, including their Colombian manager Ramon Sanchez, and Armando Normand, who was hired as an agent and translator for the firm.

Normand and Sanchez physically abused two of these Barbadians. (Note: This must have been Augustus Walcott and Clifford Quintyne,) El Proceso includes a letter Macedo wrote to a manager regarding two Barbadians who attempted to run away after they were tied up and mistreated. Macedo wanted this manager to make it clear to the Barbadians Ramon Sanchez was responsible for their abuse, and said it would be detrimental if these Barbadians proceeded against the La Chorrera agency. Sanchez was dismissed due to reports of the mistreatment of Barbadians but the agency continued to employ Normand, who eventually became the chief manager of Matanzas.

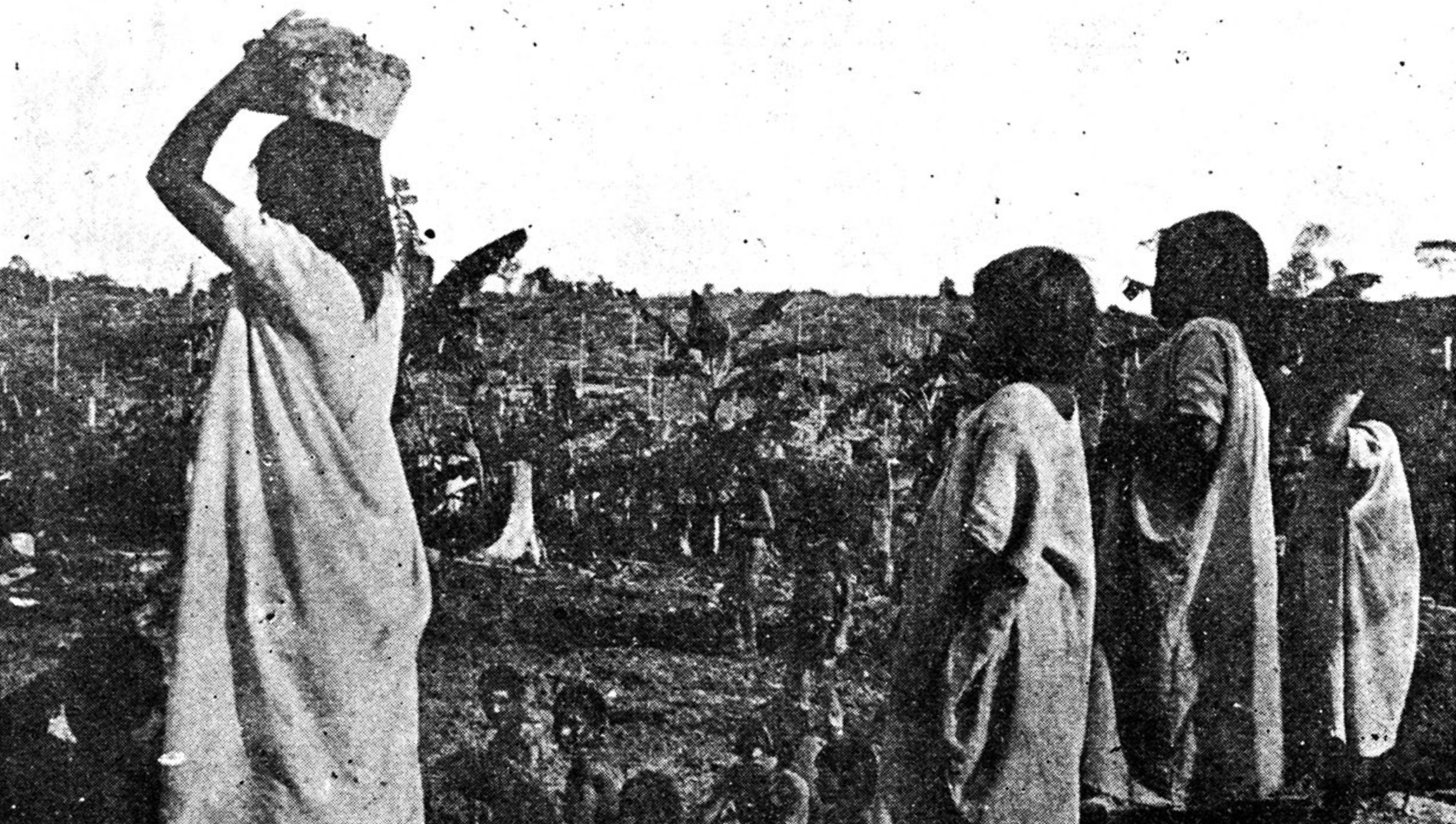
Carrying materials for construction at La Chorrera, photograph circa 1906

In 1906, Robuchon disappeared in the Putumayo near Ultimo Retiro in territory managed by the La Chorrera agency; it was rumored Arana had him disappeared because he had taken incriminating photographs of abuse that was occurring in the region. All of Robuchon's photographs were taken around La Chorrera and several of the pictures were used as evidence of slavery and physical torment under Arana's firm. Macedo conducted a census with the aid of an agent named Manuel Torrico; the estimate of 50,000 natives living in the Putumayo River basin, as recorded in Robuchon's book, may have come from this census.

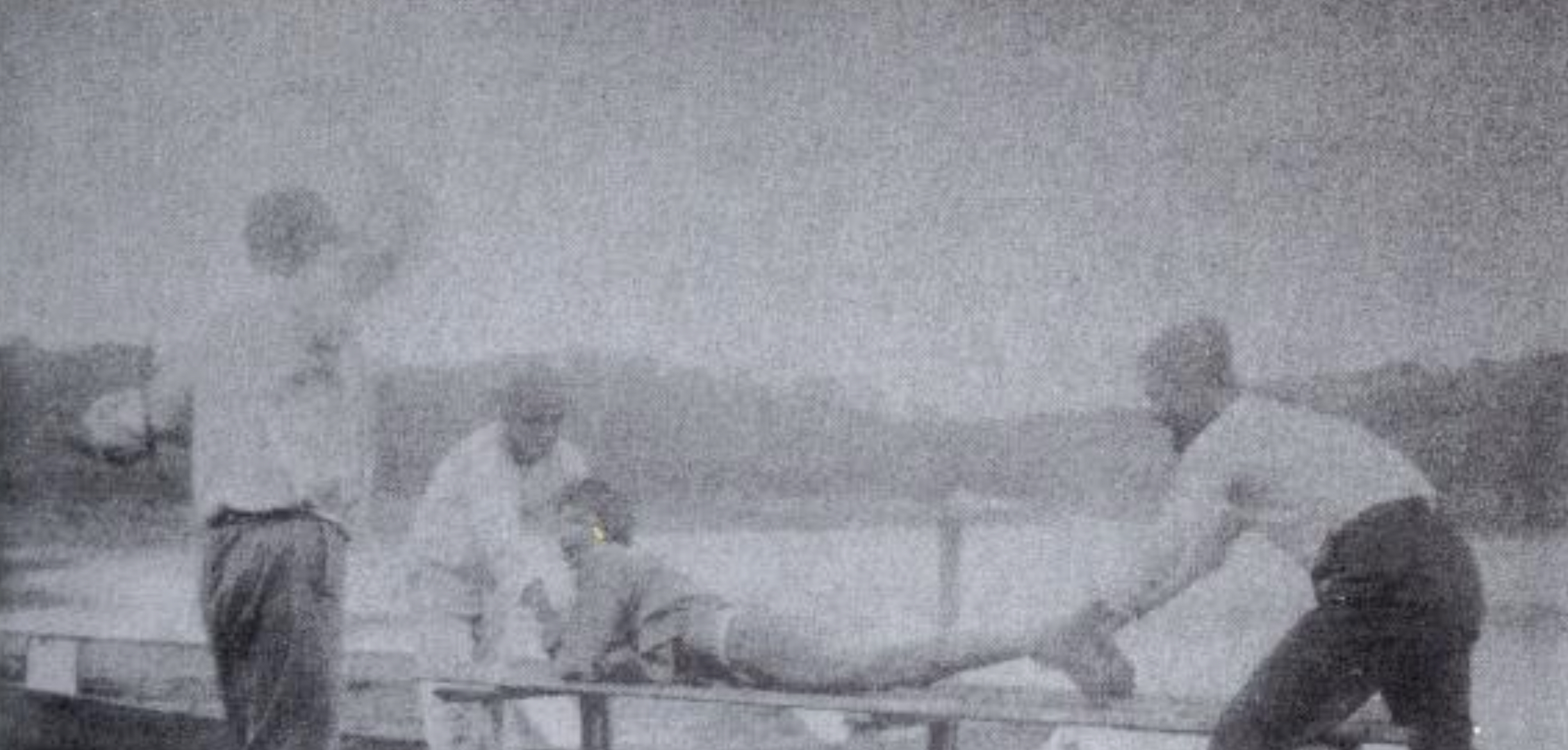
Flogging of a Putumayo native, carried out by the employees of Julio César Arana

In 1906, Macedo ordered Normand to organize a correría against a group of Colombians who were attempting to establish a rubber station near the Lower Caqueta. This attack resulted in the capture of Aquileo Torres and around ten other Colombians who worked for the rubber company Urbano Gutiérrez. Some of the captured natives were clubbed to death. Eight of the Colombians were sent to La Chorrera, which was under the management of Macedo. These Colombians were later taken on a company steamship and left near the Brazilian border with a canoe. One of the Colombians Roso España testified to authorities in Manaus that after Normand's group killed 25 natives, the group proceeded to murder women and children in the area. Torres and two of the senior employees who worked for Urbano Gutierrez were kept as prisoners at Abisinia and suffered maltreatment. Torres eventually agreed to work for the company. (Note: "He was once a Colombian magistrate, and was captured by Macedo's orders along with a lot of other Colombians because they were 'poaching' on the company's territory, and trying to get Indians to work for them.") According to Hardenburg (1912):

Another common form of punishment is that of mutilations, such as cutting off arms, legs, noses, ears, penises, hands, feet, and even heads. Castrations are also a popular punishment for such crimes as trying to escape, for being lazy, or for being stupid, while frequently they employ these forms of mutilation merely to relieve the monotony of continual floggings and murders and to provide a sort of recreation. The victims generally die within a few days, or if they do not die they are murdered, for it is said that in 1906 Macedo issued an order to his subordinates advising them to kill all mutilated Indians at once for the following reasons: first, because they consumed food although they could not work; and second, because it looked bad to have these mutilated wretches running about. (Note: The quote continues, "[t]his wise precaution of Macedo's makes it difficult to find any mutilated Indians there, in spite of the number of mutilations; for, obeying this order, the executioners kill all the Indians they mutilate, after they have suffered what they consider a sufficient space of time".)

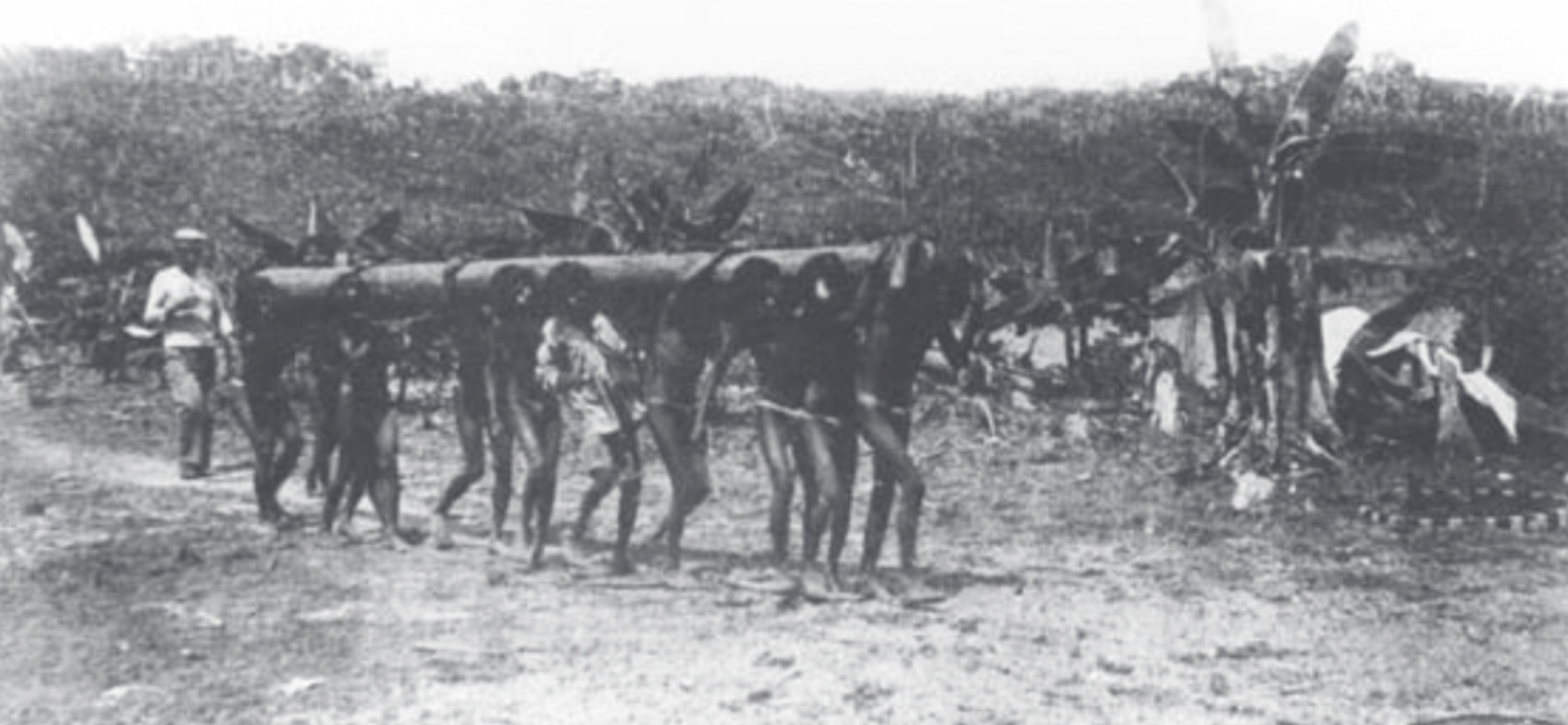
A group of Huitoto natives, forced to work La Chorrera, photograph circa 1906.

Macedo was first publicly implicated in the Putumayo genocide by Benjamin Saldaña Rocca on August 9, 1907, through a criminal petition filed against eighteen members of the J.C. Arana y Hermanos firm. Macedo's name was the first on the list compiled by Saldaña. Saldaña later decided to establish his own newspaper publications, which he would use to publicly campaign against Arana's firm. On August 22, the first issue of La Sancion included content from Saldaña's original petition and a letter from Julio Muriedas, an ex-employee of La Chorrera's agency. This letter detailed Muriedas' employment at Matanzas under Normand, and some of the methods of abuse he employed against the natives in his district, as well as the killing of these natives for not meeting a weight quota of rubber. Saldaña claimed that Macedo and his counterpart Loayza were responsible for the crimes of "swindling, robbery, incendiarism, poisoning and assassination" that was aggravated by "tortures by fire, water, the lash and mutilation" occurring under their management. The first issue also provided an account of the 1903 Ocaina massacre, claiming that Macedo and Loayza had orchestrated the killings.

Juan Castanos, a Saldaña deponent (Note: The deposition of Castanos appeared in a Saldaña article on August 22, 1907.) and manager of Porvenir, wanted passage to Iquitos so he could leave the Putumayo. Macedo opposed this because Castanos did not have enough money to pay for his passage on the steamship Liberal. Castanos later obtained enough money for the journey but the captain refused to have him on the ship. Afterward, Castano's wife was dragged away and Macedo allowed Bartolomé Zumaeta to take her as a concubine. (Note: "[Daniel] Dancourt, who asked and obtained permission from the manager, Macedo, to give this woman to the said Zumaeta as his concubine.")

== Peruvian Amazon Company ==
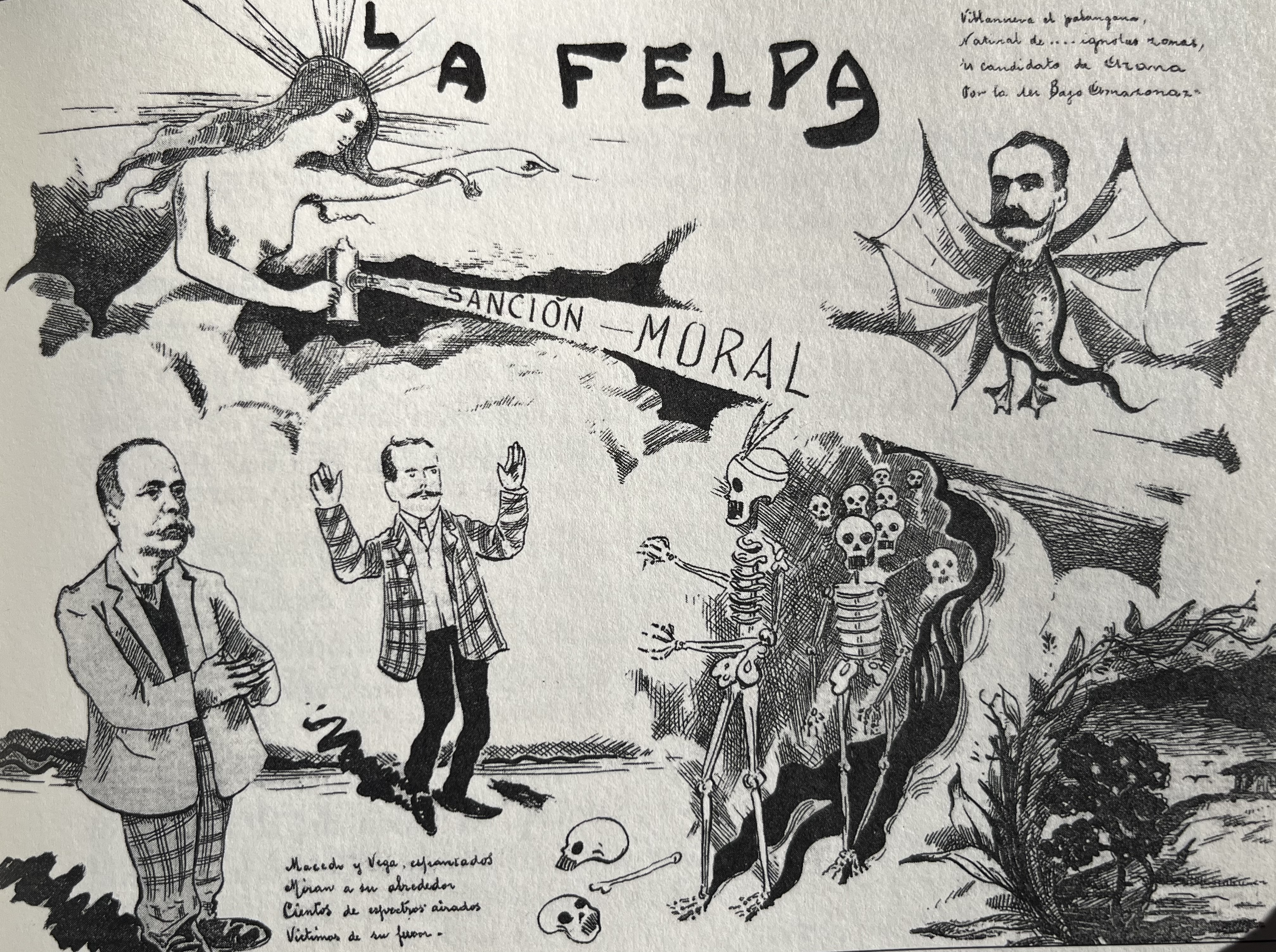
La Felpa illustration depicting Victor Macedo and Juan B. Vega

On September 6, 1907, Arana and several English investors founded the Peruvian Amazon Company, which acquired the assets of the Arana Hermanos firm. At the time, Macedo was the general manager of the La Chorrera agency, a position he retained in the new company. (Note: In his deposition to Casement, Stanley Lewis referred to Macedo as the chief of La Chorrera when Lewis arrived there in 1905.) According to the company's prospectus published by Carlos Rey de Castro, the agency consisted of forty rubber stations.

On November 19, 1907, in an article published by Benjamin Saldaña Rocca, Reynaldo Torres said Macedo, Rafael Larranaga, and Jacob Barchillon had directed the 1903 massacre of Ocainas and this incident was denounced by Aristides Rodriguez. (Note: El Proceso del Putumayo y sus secretos contains a letter Macedo wrote that refers to his denouncement by Aristides, it is letter 26 in the annex.) (Note: Torres said the 1903 massacre was perpetrated against the Gacudo and Pinaje nations of the Ocaina people.) Macedo and several other perpetrators of the massacre were arrested but Macedo escaped and returned to La Chorrera via the Napo River. Afterward, the Arana company "hushed things up" by paying 500,000 Peruvian soles, equivalent to about £50,000 at the time, in bribes. This claim by Torres was partially corroborated in a publication from 1909 which was written by Pedro Portillo. Portillo wrote that twenty-five indigenous chiefs were cruelly murdered under Benjamin Larranaga's orders as retaliation for the deaths of two of his employees. Portillo specified that Macedo had participated in these killings and Julio Arana bribed the "first instance judge... who was a corrupt man who would release prisoners for money, no matter how serious their crimes..." Reynaldo Torres attempted to leave companies service years later however he was not permitted to do so. Prefect Carlos Zapata inquired about this situation to Victor Macedo, who stated Torres was free to leave as long as he paid his debts, and at the time Torres could not afford to do so. (Note: Torres also reported information on several crimes perpetrated by Elias Martinengui at Atenas in March 1903.)

Near the end of 1907, the Peruvian Amazon Company published an essay written by Macedo that established a narrative for the massacre of Ocaina natives in 1903. According to Macedo, only three Peruvian employees were present, (Note: According to this statement, the three Peruvian witnesses were Loayza, Macedo, and one of the Rodriguez brothers. However, there were depositions from 1911 which declared Andres O'Donnell was there, along with Buccelli and Miguel Flores, another Peruvian.) and the essay does not mention the Peruvian garrison at La Chorrera. Macedo stated the Colombians perpetrated the massacre, and that he and Miguel S. Loayza did not leave their rooms because the Colombians had anti-Peruvian sentiments. In the essay, Macedo said he and Loayza were junior employees. (Note: The 1911 judicial commission to the Putumayo took depositions that incriminated the commander of the Peruvian garrison, Lieutenant Risco, with allowing the manager Larrañaga to employ these soldiers in the flagellation of natives.)

Saldaña was forced to flee Iquitos due to pressure from Arana but American engineer Walter Ernest Hardenburg obtained Saldaña's documents and continued Saldaña's work. (Note: Hardenburg had previously journeyed through the Putumayo and witnessed a massacre on the Caraparana River, which was led by Loayza and Peruvian soldiers. Saldaña's last article appeared on February 22, 1908.) Along with testimonies Saldaña collected, Hardenburg collected more than twenty depositions that reported crimes Arana's firm perpetrated against indigenous peoples. (Note: Most of these depositions report crime that occurred around La Chorrera's territory.) By the time of Hardenburg's journey through the Putumayo in 1908, Macedo was general manager of La Chorrera and the most-senior employee of the agency.

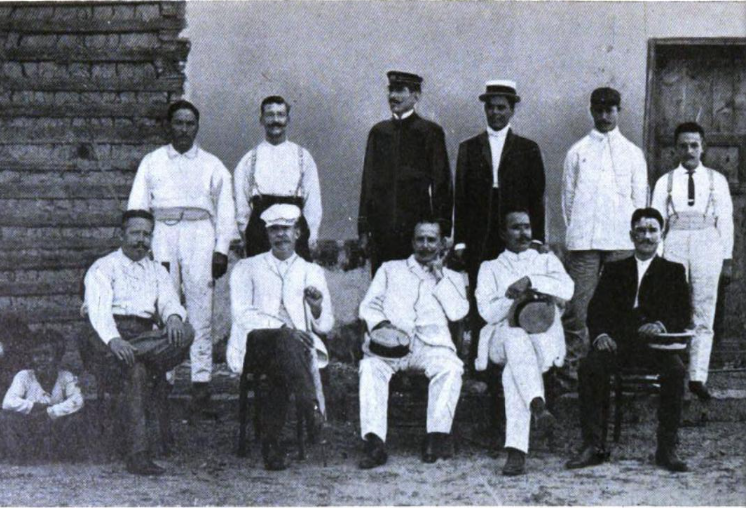
Peruvian Amazon Company employees at La Chorrera. Macedo is seated third from the right.

Among Hardenburg's deponents was firefighter Daniel Collantes, who in 1902 was employed on a river launch owned by Arana before Macedo ordered him to transfer to a rubber station. Collantes stated he refused to do so because he was aware crimes were perpetrated in the forest, and he was imprisoned at La Chorrera for ten days for his refusal. When Collantes complained to Macedo, Macedo gave an order for Collantes to be whipped 100 times and for his mouth to be covered so he would not cry. In his deposition, Collantes said the massacre of Ocaina natives occurred 150 m (490 ft) away from the headquarters at La Chorrera, and that there were forty natives rather than thirty. These natives arrived as prisoners and were detained together in chains in a cell. Collantes stated at 4:00 a.m. the next morning, Macedo ordered eighteen employees from the section of La Sabana to flog the imprisoned natives to death. Hours later, Macedo ordered the employees to drag the natives out of the cell, shoot them and cremate their remains. According to Collantes, the collection of firewood and kerosene began at 9:00 a.m. and Macedo gave the order for the fire to begin at 12:00 a.m.

According to Collantes, shortly after the massacre he told Macedo he wished to leave the company and journey to Iquitos: "[t]he reply this miserable criminal gave me was to threaten me with more chains and imprisonment, telling me that he was the only one who gave orders in this region and that all who lived here were subject to his commands." Collantes also reported information on a correría Jose Innocente Fonseca led on Macedo's orders. Macedo ordered Fonseca to organize a commission of twenty men to travel towards the Caqueta and kill any Colombians they found there. The members of this commission were told to bring back the fingers, ears and severed heads of their victims. These body parts were shown to Macedo and Miguel S. Loayza, the general manager of the company's agency at El Encanto. Celestino Lopez wrote to Hardenburg and said he "also saw Dancurt, the official executioner of La Chorrera, flog the poor Indians almost daily for the most trivial faults: all with the knowledge and approbation of Victor Macedo, manager of La Chorrera and Justice of the Peace of the Putumayo".

According to Barbadian John Brown, Macedo was present during some instances of flagellation by Dancurt of indigenous people on Macedo's orders. When Thomas Whiffen arrived at La Chorrera, the punishment of natives in public ceased "and everything was done to hide from Capt. Whiffen the true facts of the case". Barbadian James Chase believed Macedo sent an agent to warn each section of Whiffen's arrival so Whiffen would not see anything incriminating. Frederick Bishop, another Barbadian, reported Whiffen's movements were monitored while he was in the Putumayo and any evidence of atrocities was "cleared up" before he would arrive at his next destination. Whiffen was told Macedo would be dismissed and that reforms would be made.

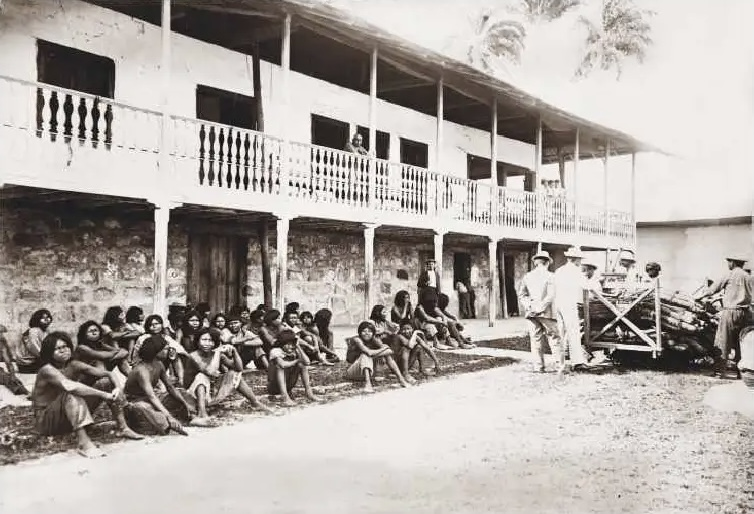
Putumayo natives resting at La Chorrera after delivering rubber. The rubber can be seen on the right. Photograph circa 1912.

In September 1909, Hardenburg began publishing a series of articles in Truth, a small newspaper. The first article, titled "The Devil's Paradise: A British-Owned Congo", made a comparison between conditions in the Putumayo River basin and atrocities in the Congo Free State. Some of Hardenburg's reporting directly implicated station managers under Macedo with murder and torture. In response to the Truth articles, the Peruvian Amazon Company decided to send a commercial commission to investigate the conditions in the region, and the British Foreign Office sent Consul-General Roger Casement to inspect the treatment of Barbadian men in the region. (Note: "[H]is locus standi being secured on the grounds that a number of British subjects, coloured men of Barbadoes, had been employed by Arana and the Peruvian agents of the company as slave-drivers.") Prior to 1910, Macedo became justice of the peace in the Putumayo, which was a government position.

In March 1910, Augusto Jiménez Seminario led a correría from Ultimo Retiro across the Caqueta into Colombian territory, capturing three Colombians and twenty-one natives. The raid was carried out under Macedo's direct orders. Macedo signed a document of monetary gratification dated February 25, 1910, that was administered to members of the raid who Jiménez thought performed satisfactorily. (Note: The names of these Colombians were Ramon Vargas, Mosquiero, and Tejo. Vargas had agreed to work for the Peruvian Amazon Company by the time of Casement's visit to Atenas in October of 1910. The Barbadians Reuben Philips and Edward Crichlow took part in this raid, which is described in their depositions to Casement.)

=== Consular commission of 1910 ===
Macedo and Juan A. Tízon received Casement and the company commissioners at La Chorrera on September 22, 1910. (Note: "Tizon had been sent out to the district a few months previously in preparation for the Commissioners' visit and was a well-respected citizen of Iquitos" – Angus Mitchell.) Casement thought if Macedo attended the interviews with the Barbadians, he would attempt to make a formal enquiry for the courts in Iquitos to investigate them with the intent of making the Barbadians "scapegoats, both to justify Macedo and clear the Peruvian authorities too, and also to destroy any real evidence of the wholesale crimes that have been allowed for years in this unhappy region". Casement decided to have Tízon present for the interviews, and while Macedo stood and listened at the door for a time, he was not invited so he walked off. Casement also thought Macedo would attempt to bribe the Barbadians to lie. A Barbadian named Frederick Bishop persuaded many of the other Barbadians to testify to Casement before Macedo and Normand had the opportunity to coerce them into silence. In his deposition, Bishop reported in January 1909, Macedo had him "put in guns", a punishment in which a detainee was held in an uncomfortable position at the point of several guns. The victim would then be whipped. The order was carried out by the commander of La Chorrera's garrison, a captain of the Peruvian military.

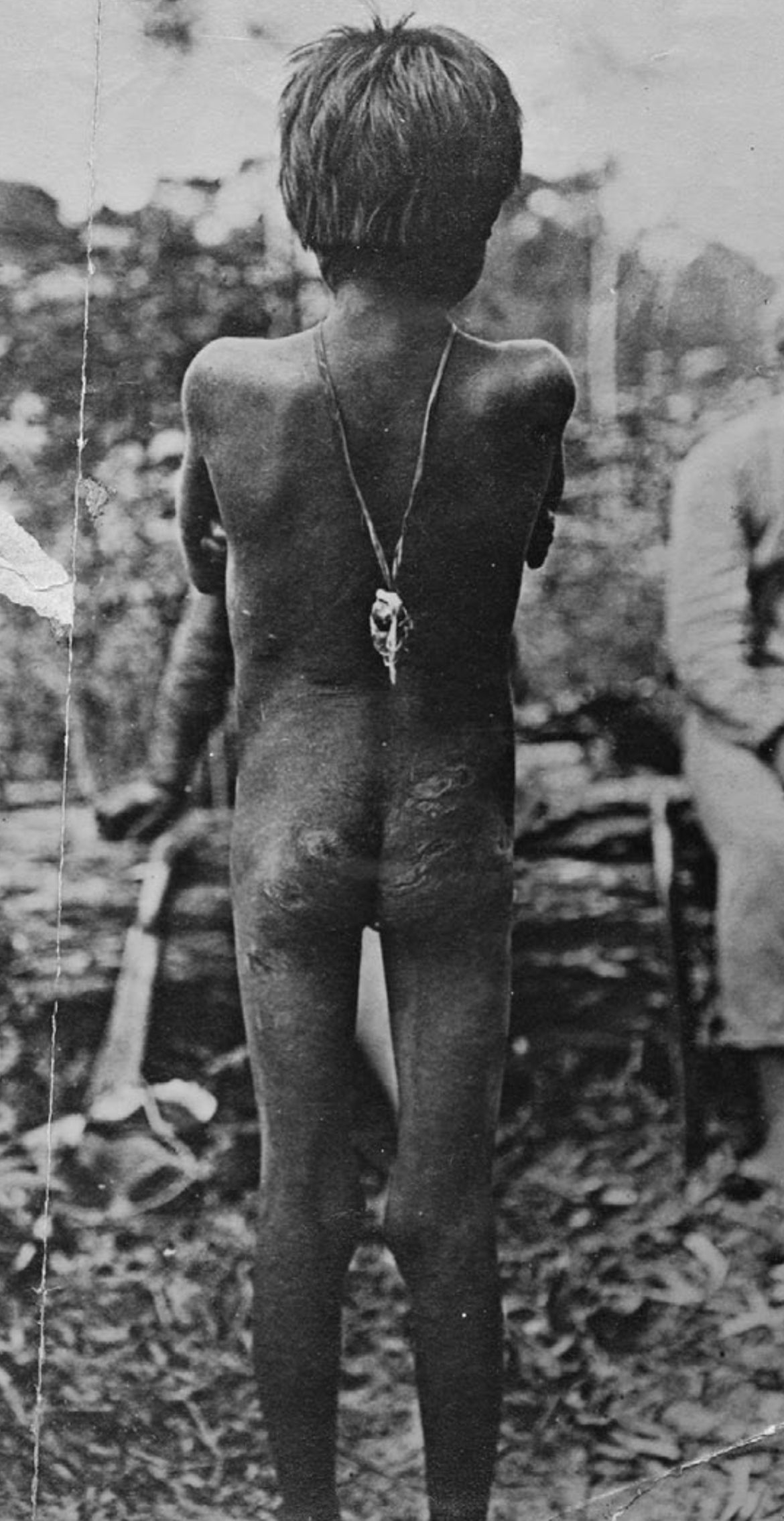
The "Mark of Arana", scars from flagellation on the back of an indigenous boy, photograph circa 1910

Bishop stated: "Macedo knew what happened often in the sections, as he visited them and saw prisoners and flogging". Donald Francis told Bishop Macedo had threatened to have him shot if he reported anything against Macedo. Francis, Edward Crichlow and James Lane said Macedo offered them bribes. Casement asked Stanley Sealy why he did not report any of the crimes to Macedo; Sealy said there was no point in doing so because "he had believed señor Macedo knew all about the wrong things done". Joshua Dyall provided the same reasoning as Sealy when Casement asked him if he reported any killings to Macedo. Dyall had been physically abused by Alfredo Montt, "badly flogged", beaten with a gun, and when he complained about this treatment to Macedo, Macedo ordered him to go to Ultimo Retiro and he was threatened with being tied up and flogged again. Adolphus Gibbs told Casement both Augusto Jiménez and Macedo had struck him because he wanted to leave the company. Macedo gave an indigenous concubine to the Barbadian Evelyn Batson around November 1908. A Barbadian named Norman Walcott told Casement in November 1909, he witnessed Victor Macedo flogging a native man of around eighteen years old. Walcott did not report any other cases of abuse to Roger Casement.

At La Chorrera, Casement saw Macedo's son playing with a young girl whose father had been "killed by his own muchachos". Casement believed this case was representative of the relationship dynamic between the muchachos de confianza and their exploiters. (Note: "[T]he muchachos armed and exercised in murdering their own unfortunate countrymen, or, rather, Boras Indians murdering Huitotos and vice versa for the pleasure, or supposed profit, of their masters, who in the end turn on these (from a variety of motives) and kill them. And this is called 'civilising' the wild Indians!") While discussing the accounts of the Barbadian men with Casement, Macedo offered to remove 25% of the debts they owed. Casement interpreted the offer as a bribe meant to silence him. (Note: This is described in two separate quotes made by Casement. The first, "[i]t is really a bribe to me! Macedo wishes to pose as the just, kind man and to have my good word to the end." As well as "[i]f I sanction this deal between Macedo and the men I practically close the question of their treatment by the Company".) Casement also noted Macedo sent at least two agents to warn the chiefs of sections about Casement's presence during his investigation. According to Tízon, the station at Matanzas had been operating at a "dead loss for some time" by 1910. The commissions for Normand and Macedo, as well as the expenditure for the Matanzas station's necessities – including employees' salaries – absorbed all of the station's potential profits.

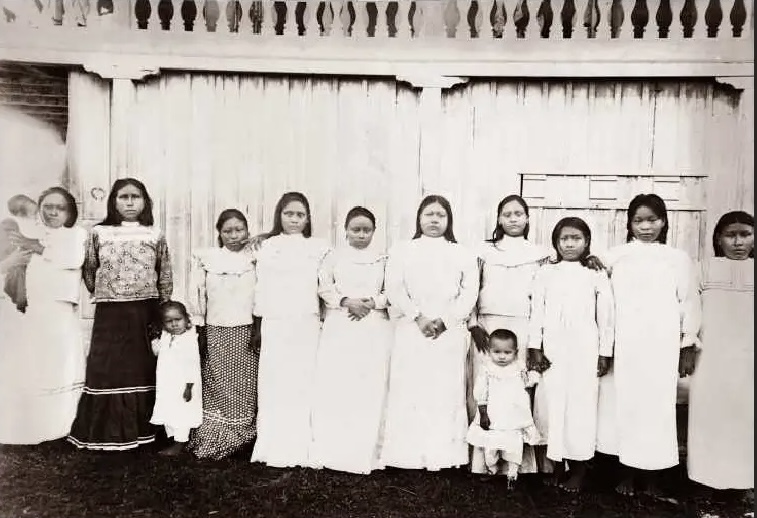
Photograph of the concubines of the Peruvian Amazon Company at La Chorrera, 1912

While watching the delivery of rubber from the Sur station in 1910, Casement asked Omarino, a young native, if he wanted to go to London with Casement. (Note: Casement later weighed Omarino who weighed 25 kg (55 lb) while the load of rubber he transported weighed 29.5 kg (65 lb). The father, mother, and elder brother of Omarino were killed prior to Casement's journey to the Putumayo.) Omarino agreed and his captain requested a "shirt and a pair of trousers"; (Note: "virtually the sale of this child".) Macedo sanctioned this transaction for Omarino's freedom. (Note: "Macedo with great unction made me a 'present' of the boy.") Near the end of Casement's investigation, Macego gave an indigenous woman to Abelardo Aguero as a gift.

Macedo gifted Casement a chiviclis, a "small rodent-like animal", prior to his departure from La Chorrera in November. (Note: A footnote describes the chiviclis as a "small rodent-like animal with a reddish-brown fur that looks a little like a cross between a guinea pig and a squirrel".) After Casement's investigation in 1910, Pablo Zumaeta's brother-in-law Amadeo Burga succeeded Macedo as the justice of the peace. Macedo was also superseded by Tízon as the chief agent at La Chorrera. While Casement was returning to Iquitos via the Liberal, the ship stopped at Recreio, a settlement at the mouth of the Yaguas River. Casement witnessed four natives paddling in a canoe with a man and a woman, and the captain of the Liberal stated the natives had been given as a gift from Macedo. (Note: The Liberal collected rubber and firewood at Recreio. This led Casement to conclude natives on the Yaguas River were suffering similar conditions of exploitation as those on the Putumayo, only on a smaller scale.)

=== Judicial commission of 1911 ===
Macedo left the Putumayo on Liberal with Andrés O'Donnell and the Commercial Commission in February 1911, prior to the arrival at La Chorrera of Rómulo Paredes and his judicial commission. Macedo had around 80,000 soles (£8,000) after his dismissal from the Peruvian Amazon Company, £2,000 of which came from a special gratification paid to him by Pablo Zumaeta. Upon their arrival in Iquitos, Macedo and a man named Zegarra (Note: During the 1910 commission, two Boras natives who had their ears cut off pointed Zegarra out to Louis Barnes, a member of the commission, and the natives stated it was Zegarra who mutilated them. Zegarra was promptly dismissed by Tizon.) were interrogated by the sub-prefect, who said there was no evidence against Macedo and Zegarra.

In his statement at Iquitos, Macedo said he was not aware a massacre had occurred until the next day. He said he "knew from references Benjamin Larrañaga and Loayza were present" at the massacre; however, he stated they could not prevent the massacre because Larrañaga was drunk at the time, and Macedo and Loayza were junior employees. He also stated there were twenty-five victims of this massacre. In his deposition, Macedo gave testimony about several killings by Colombians in the region before 1907, most notably Crisostomo Hernandez, and he also said an uprising in 1905 at Ultimo Retiro was instigated by Gregorio Calderón. Macedo also accused Colombians of instigating the 1909 mutiny that led to the death of Buccelli and three other agents. Miguel Flores also participated in the 1903 massacre. Flores had perpetrated killings of so many natives at La Chorrera Macedo reprimanded him for this and told him to only kill natives when they stopped delivering rubber.

In his statement, Isaac Escurra said he saw eleven adult natives – ten men and one woman who had a child – who were imprisoned in the cepo next to Macedo's room. Carlos Miranda had these natives whipped, after which they were kept in the cepo for three days without food. During those three days, Escurra told Macedo these natives should have been receiving something to eat but they were not given anything. Macedo gave an order to have lime poured over the eleven natives after an employee complained they were starting to smell bad due to their wounds rotting. Afterward, Escurra stated Macedo ignored the fate of these imprisoned natives. In his deposition, Escurra also stated he saw dogs consuming the heads of two natives at La Chorrera; according to Macedo, the heads belonged to natives who had died from smallpox. Escurra did not believe this was the truth. While eating at a table in La Chorrea along with Macedo and several other station chiefs, Escurra denounced to Macedo the crimes he had witnessed Elias Martinengui commit at Atenas but he was told "not to speak of those things in public, but to come to his office for a talk". Macedo told Escurra he knew everyone at the table was a criminal and he did not need to be told so. Macedo said it would be impossible for work in the region to proceed if he hired decent people because the natives could only be dominated through rigor. According to Valcarcel, this statement may explain why there were so many criminals in the Putumayo. Escurra later went to a member of the Iquitos superior court who told him to keep quiet and that Arana was expected in Iquitos and Escurra could talk to him then. Jose Plaza, another employee at La Chorrea's agency, denounced Alfredo Montt's crimes to Macedo; in response Macedo sent Plaza to the station at La Sabana, which was managed by Aristides Rodriguez.

El Proceso del Putumayo y sus secretos inauditos contains eight eyewitness accounts of the massacre, including one by Macedo. (Note: Deponents on the 1903 massacre include Daniel Collantes, E. Mozbamite, Santiago Portocarrero, Macedo, Loayza, Gregorio Aramuya.) Deponent Emilio Mozambite said Macedo witnessed the massacre but he did not participate. Macedo said the massacre was directed by Rafael Larranaga and was carried out as retribution for an uprising that occurred that year and resulted in the death of a Colombian rubber patron and his employees. Santiago Portocarrero said both Macedo and Loayza had knowledge of the crimes perpetrated in their agencies; Portocarrero was confident about this because he had overheard these bosses talking about the crime. Eusebio Pinedo also said Macedo and Loayza witnessed the massacre but did not participate. Deponent Gregorio Arimuya said Macedo and Loayza witnessed the massacre but did not participate. At the end of Arimuya's statement, he reported Aymenes natives were flogged by Peruvian soldiers under the orders of a lieutenant Risco at La Chorrera. Esetan Angulo's testimony corroborated Arimuya's statement about Peruvian soldiers flogging natives at La Chorrera. Fifteen natives suffered this punishment because they refused to collect rubber and in retaliation, Rafael Larrañaga ordered them to be flogged. Angulo stated some of the Peruvian soldiers garrisoned at Chorrera helped carry out the flagellation. (Note: Lorenzo Munayari stated he had seen Lieutenant Risco flog some of the Aymenes natives.) This information regarding the Peruvian garrison at La Chorrera contradicts Macedo's claim from his 1907 statement where he said the Peruvians could not intervene during the massacre of Ocainas because there were only three Peruvian employees at La Chorrera. The Peruvian garrison at La Chorrera was first established in 1902. (Note: Paredes cited a report from a prefect of Loreto which stated that the Peruvian garrison in the Putumayo had assisted Arana's company on multiple occasions.)

The judge investigated the scene of the 1903 Ocaina massacre at La Chorrera and collected enough evidence to confirm the massacre had taken place. The massacre of Puineses and Renuicueses natives that occurred in 1903 at La Chorrera was also confirmed; a large amount of bones were discovered and there was evidence a fire had occurred in that location. After interviewing Macedo and several other Peruvian Amazon Company employees in 1911, the judge said: "[a]lthough Macedo and Loayza witnessed these events, it has not been proven that they took part in it".

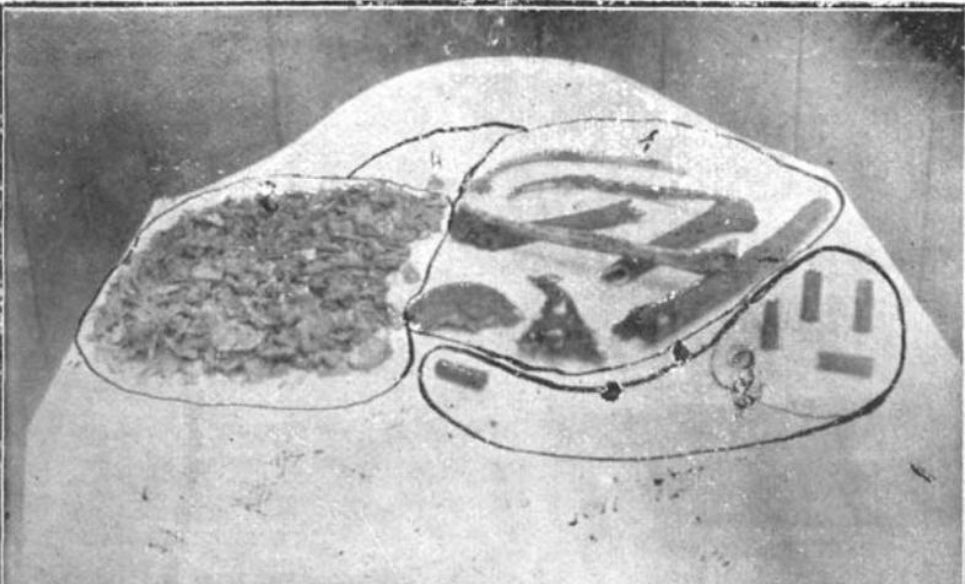
Evidence collected by the Paredes commission in 1911

Paredes wrote: "[a]ccording to the evidence taken in the enquiry it would seem that the fire massacre in La Chorrera gave rise to these chiefs. The execution of thirty Ocainas Indians, [who were] tortured and burned alive, was thus a sort of patent, a diploma for governing sanctions." Based on the information he examined, Casement believed: "[t]his crime was committed by Victor Macedo's direction, and on the strength of this act of fortitude he became eventually the chief of all sections as general manager at La Chorrera, deriving from his presidency of crime an income of well over £3,000 a year."

Paredes emphasized that a population in the Putumayo River basin which Carlos Rey de Castro estimated to be 50,000 natives had fallen to 8,000 between 1906 and 1911. (Note: In 1910 Casement believed there were fewer than 10,000 natives in the area of the Putumayo managed by Arana's company. Paredes said his commission could not find more than 7,000 natives in the region, and that this group was in the Putumayo longer than Casement.) The 1907 Peruvian Amazon Company prospectus said there were 40,000 "Indian 'labourers'" in the region at the time of its publication.

Paredes said he spared no effort in attempting to capture several of the "worst criminals" but that Macedo had assisted them in leaving from the region before the judge's arrival. After saying Macedo wrote a letter to the prefect of Loreto denying the massacre in 1903 occurred, Paredes wrote: "it is perfectly defined that Macedo is a concealer of such crimes: that furthermore Macedo has taken advantage of and assisted the criminals to take advantage of the crime".

Following the Paredes investigation, three sets of arrest warrants were issued against men who had worked in the Putumayo for Arana's rubber firm. The first set was issued against twenty-two individuals who were implicated in the massacre of Ocaina natives in September 1903, charging them with "the crime of flogging and flaying thirty Ocaina Indians and then burning them alive". The second set of warrants was issued on June 29 against 215 employees of the agency at La Chorrera. (Note: "[C]harged with a multiplicity of murders and tortures of the Indians all throughout that region.")

Judge Valcárcel issued Macedo's arrest warrant on July 29, 1911, along with a warrant for Pablo Zumaeta and several other Peruvian Amazon Company employees against whom who Paredes did not proceed. In August, the mayor of Lima and the prefect of Callao sent telegraphs to the Paredes with a request to dismiss the arrest warrant against Macedo. One of these telegrams said Macedo had influential friends in Lima. Seymour Bell, a member of the 1910 commission, stated that members of the Peruvian Congress had also sent telegraphs protesting Macedo's arrest warrant. (Note: The man who obtained the original copies of the two telegrams sent to Paredes, stated that the prefect of Iquitos and the courts of Iquitos had also been wired by "persons 'much higher'" than the prefect of Callao and mayor of Lima.)

Casement's source stated Macedo was in Lima between September and October 1911. Lucien Jerome, an English consul general at Lima, stated Macedo had been living openly in the city and that when the local authorities investigated Macedo's last known address, there was no sign of him but it was determined he had recently left.

Judge Paredes later showed several telegrams to Casement that were sent by "highly placed individuals in Lima" that requested the dismissal of Macedo's warrant. Several of these individuals include the deputies to Congress Hildebrando Fuentes and Ingoyen Canseco, and Emilio Rodriguez Larrain, the secretary to the President of Peru Augusto B. Leguía. Larrain had sent a telegraph to a member of the Iquitos courts asking why there was a warrant issued against Macedo and requesting the dismissal of that warrant. This led Valcárcel to believe Larrain was responsible for Macedo's release. A former prefect of Lima Pedro Garezon reported Macedo had been captured but Garezon released Macedo instead of sending him to Iquitos. Julio Ego-Aguirre, who succeeded Garezon as the prefect of Lima and also served as the lawyer for Julio César Arana, said: "he had not found Macedo in detention" when he was asked to send Macedo to Iquitos. (Note: Zumaeta paid Macedo was an additional £2,000 on top of the credit he was owed by the company.) Paredes issued the warrant on the basis of a Peruvian law that stated: "[w]hen there is a corpus delicti, simple indications of guilt are sufficient to order the arrest of the accused". (Note: The law which Paredes cites is contained within Article 70 of the Criminal Procedure Code of Peru.)

Eduardo and Francisco Lanatta were employed as lawyers in Iquitos for Macedo during the judicial proceedings against him. There were allegations the Lanatta brothers had unofficial business dealings with Paredes but Paredes refuted this in El Proceso, noting he would not have issued an arrest warrant for Macedo if there was an agreement between the Lanatta brothers and himself. Valcárcel, who originally filed the arrest warrants against Macedo and Pablo Zumaeta, was dismissed from his office on October 31, 1911, by the Superior Court of Iquitos.

== Later life ==
Victor Macedo was reported to have secured passage on a ship heading towards Barbados in November 1911, and from there he traveled to Manaus. Macedo, Armando Normand and several other Peruvian Amazon Company employees were seen in Manaus by a Barbadian informant who wrote to Casement. (Note: Casement's informant believed they were heading toward the Acre River basin.) In December 1911, Macedo was again reported to have been in Manaus along with Arana but the nature of this encounter was unknown to Casement's informant. Near the end of 1911, Macedo went to Iquitos to defend himself in court and Casement said: "[t]he Superior Court will probably go down in a body to greet him & have him to dinner".

On October 17, 1912, it was reported Jimenez and Macedo were together in Bolivia at Cobiga, and that Aguero was nearby. In 1914, The Anti-Slavery Reporter and Aborigines' Friend published an article titled "The Putumayo Criminals" that was based on details provided by one of its informants. This informant stated Victor Macedo was frequently traveling around Manaus, the Japurá River and the Acre River with financial assistance for his activities provided by Arana. Macedo was also traveling with E. Mozambite – presumably Emilio Mozambite – and Fidel Velarde, one of his station chiefs. Abelardo Aguero, Augusto Jiménez and Carlos Miranda, three of Macedo's station chiefs at La Chorrera, were also in Bolivia close to the border with Brazil, where they continued to exploit natives to extract rubber. In April 1914, both Jimenez and Aguero were arrested on an estate belonging to the rubber baron Nicolás Suárez Callaú but the Bolivian Consul who reported their arrest said Macedo had left the area before the authorities arrived. After April 1914, there were no further reports regarding the whereabouts of Macedo.

== See also ==
- Peruvian Amazon Company
- Putumayo genocide
- Julio César Arana
- Miguel S. Loayza
