= Benjamin Saldaña Rocca =

Peruvian soldier and journalist (1865–1912)

Benjamin Saldaña Rocca (1865–1912) was a distinguished Peruvian soldier and later journalist, mostly known for his role in exposing the Putumayo genocide which was perpetrated by Julio César Arana and the Peruvian Amazon Company.

Born in Lima, Saldaña distinguished himself as a soldier in the War of the Pacific, participating in battles such as San Juan, Miraflores, and San Pablo. After his military service, he founded several newspapers in Lima, including "El Fósforo," "La Pampa de Tebas," and "La Sotana," between 1899 and 1903. Around the age of 37, he relocated to Iquitos, where he established the newspapers "La Sanción" and "La Felpa." Through these publications, Saldaña courageously revealed the crimes perpetrated in the Putumayo region under Arana's company, advocating for justice and bringing international attention to the plight of the indigenous population.

== Early life ==
Benjamin was born on 1865, in Lima. Early in his life, Saldaña gained some notoriety by distinguishing himself as a soldier. According to Luis Hernán Ramírez, during the War of the Pacific Saldaña Rocca fought at the battles of San Juan, Miraflores, and during battle of San Pablo in defense of Lima. Coincidentally, another future activist and critic of the Peruvian oligarchic government, Manuel González Prada fought at the battle of San Pablo in 1880. After leaving the Peruvian military, Saldaña went on to found three newspapers in Lima, with the names "El Fósforo," "La Pampa de Tebas" and "La Sotana" between the years 1899–1903. These newspapers were no longer active by the time he moved to Iquitos around the age of 37.

== In Iquitos ==
Saldaña filed a criminal petition against eighteen members of the Peruvian Amazon Company on August 9, 1907. Within the petition he included details of horrific acts of cruelty and barbarism against the indigenous population who collected rubber for the company in the Putumayo. One incident committed at the Ultimo Retiro station implicated a manager named Argaluza with the death of a native woman. Argaluza ordered the Barbadian employees Stanley Lewis and Ernesto Siobers to administer 155 stripes after accusing the woman of sleeping with another young man.

On August 22, after only receiving silence from the Iquitos courts, Saldaña published the first issue of La Sancion, which can translate to "The Castigation." The first issue made a public attack against Arana and his company by detailing some of the atrocities occurring within the Putumayo region. Saldaña relayed his intentions and resolve in the August 22 issue, stating: “Enough of mysteries and cover-ups... I will fight undaunted and without respite, scorning the switchblade of the assassin and the pistol of the thug.” The publication promised the exposing and denouncement of those committing crimes in the region, and also included content from the original criminal petition that was filed.

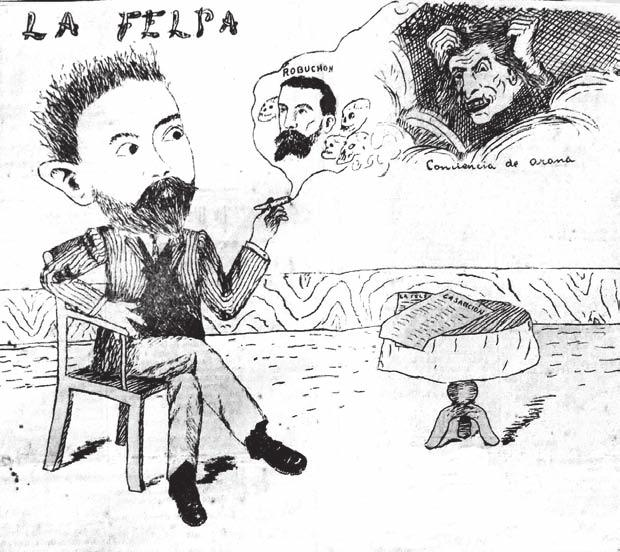
"The conscience of Arana." The illustration is based on rumors that Julio Cesar Arana had Eugene Robuchon murdered

Within this first issue, Saldaña included a letter from Julio Muriedas, who worked for Arana at Matanzas under the manager Armando Normand. Muriedas relayed that Normand applied 200 whip lashes or even more to the Natives when they did not meet the rubber quota he required. At other times, when the Native flees because they will not meet their rubber quota, Normand has the Native's children suspended by their hands and feet before applying fire. This is done so the children will expose where their fathers have hidden. Muriedas also stated "On more than one occasion, always for lack of weight of the rubber, the Indians are shot, or their arms and legs are cut off with machetes and the body is thrown around the house; and more than once the repugnant spectacle of dogs dragging about the arms or legs of one of these unfortunates has been witnessed." This deposition further relayed "another scene, excessively inhuman and repugnant" detailing the sexual abuse of a woman named Matilde by employees of the rubber company, and specifically Bartolomé Zumaeta. Details about the flagellations as well as the killing of multiple members of the Yaquebuas and Nuisayes tribes, some of whom were captains, were included in this letter. According to Julio Murieda, "These are the actual deeds that are carried out constantly in the Putumayo, and for the lack of one kilogram in the weight of their quota of rubber they murder, mutilate, and torture the people."

August 31, 1907 saw the first issue of La Felpa, which was another publication started by Saldaña Rocca, which can translate to "The Scolding." This was a shorter newspaper containing four pagers, published every two weeks, and contained an illustration or political cartoon to further drive its point. La Felpa's first issue ran with the headline "The Crimes of the Putumayo: Flagellations, Mutilations, Tortures, and Target Practice," and depicted some of the ways in which Natives were being maltreated in the Putumayo. The newspaper included a few names of Peruvian Amazon Company employees connected linked to the events depicted in La Felpa's first article, two of which include José Innocente Fonseca shown in "Target Practice" and Aquiléo Torres in "Tortures". The issue published by La Felpa on January 5, 1908 included a list of the principal criminals, which were the chiefs of sections. These names include Armando Normand, José Innocente Fonseca, Abelardo Agüero, Augusto Jiménez Seminario, Arístides Rodríguez, Aurelio Rodríguez, Alfredo Montt, Fidel Velarde, Carlos Miranda, and Andrés O’Donnell.

Until the end of La Felpa's operation, Arana and his enterprise continued to be the publication's centerspread. On multiple occasions Arana was portrayed as a devil, or was shown surrounded by skulls. One publication of La Felpa dubbed Arana as "Genio de mal" which translates to "Genius of evil".Saldaña defended the use of caricatures in his newspapers by stating it had two points: “the first is that the caricature is the pathetic relationship with the accomplished fact, and second, because, it more radically corrects the offender by exposing him to the crime in fragrant.”

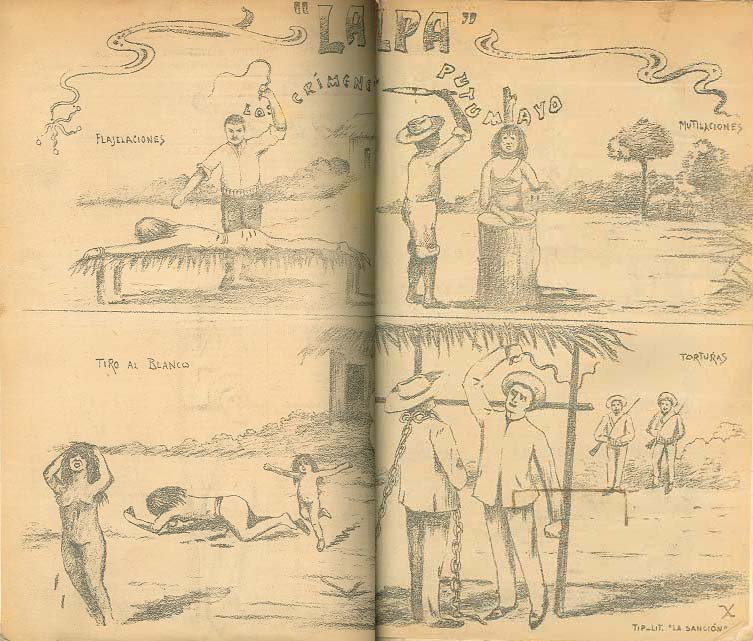
Illustration on the first issue of 'LA FELPA'

In his articles, Saldaña emphasized that Julio César Arana, one of Iquitos most prominent citizens at the time, was the main architect and solicitor of these atrocities. New revelations against Arana's company were published with each issue of La Sancion, including eyewitness accounts from ex-employees from Arana's company, detailing a coercive and violent system maintained by torture, maiming, as well as murder of Indigenous populations in the Putumayo. La Sancion was originally supposed to appear twice a week, however the newspaper eventually turned into a daily publisher. Saldaña's newspapers occasionally warned its readers to avoid work in the Putumayo, on one occasion stating "As is evident, it is a horror to go to the Putumayo. I should prefer to go to hell." Readers were invited to go to the La Sancion printing office if they thought Saldaña was trying to deceive them, and there he stated he would give details and "show him authentic documents, proving the truth of my assertions."

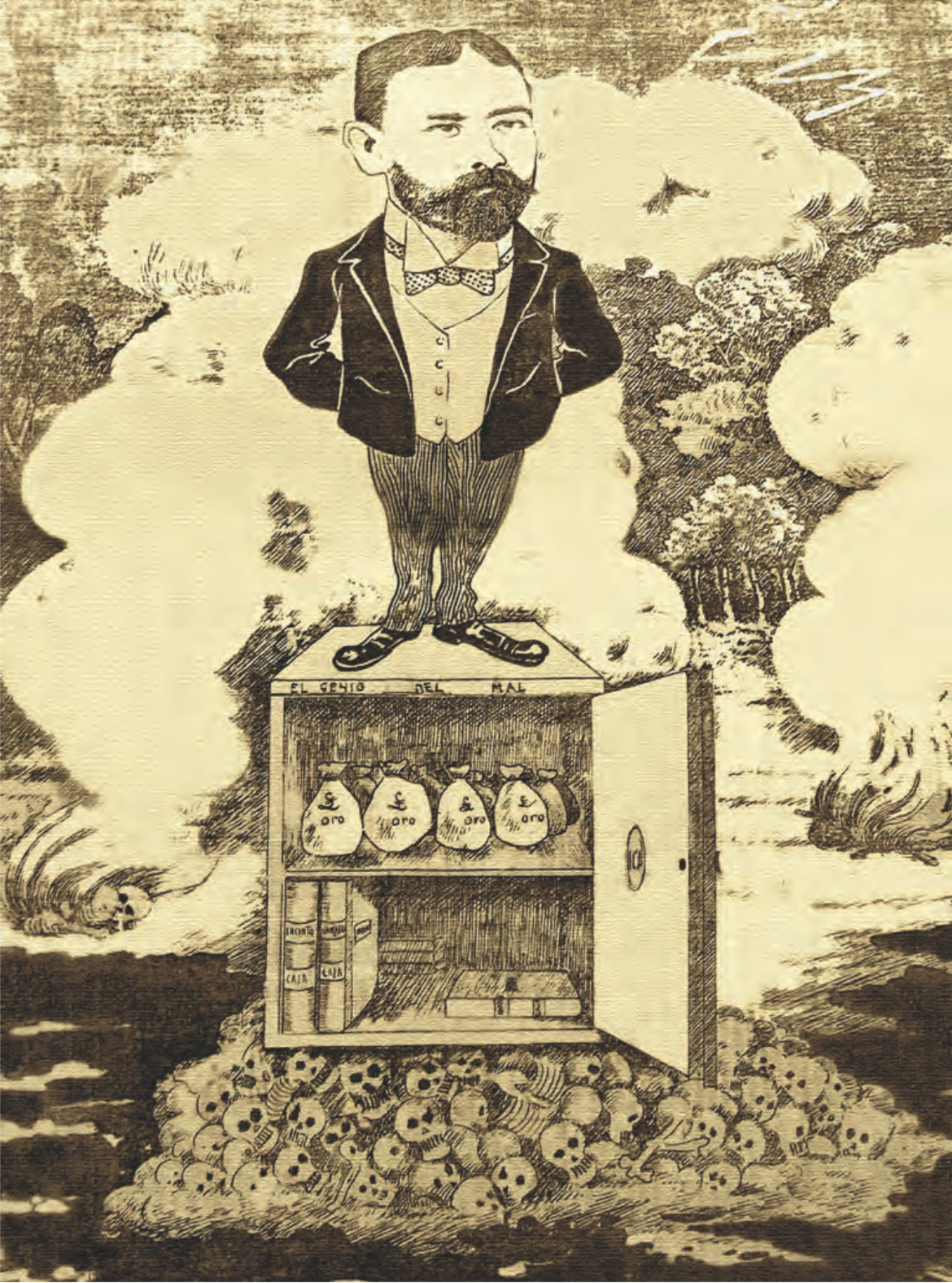
Illustration of the rubber baron Julio César Arana, published by La Felpa in 1908

The last issue for Saldaña's publications in Iquitos came on February 22, 1908. Saldaña was tipped off that police were going to escort him out of Iquitos, but he apparently evaded them. This coincided with the arrival of Julio Arana in Iquitos, who was previously in London where he registered the Peruvian Amazon Company. Before Saldaña left the city, he left his work with Miguel Galvez, his son and gave Miguel instructions to pass on the documents to a reliable person that would continue his crusade. Galvez gave this body of work to Walter Ernest Hardenburg, an American engineer who had recently travelled through the Putumayo on the way to the Madeira-Mamoré Railroad construction project. Hardenburg was previously arrested by the Company, and witnessed a massacre against a Colombian rubber outpost while he was imprisoned on the 'Liberal' steamboat. Saldaña's documents contained multiple first hand accounts from ex-employees of Arana's rubber enterprise, most of which were sworn before a notary.

== Later life ==
Hardenburg, and by extension Saldaña's work was first published in the English world in September 1909, by Sidney Paternoster in a magazine named Truth, under the headline "The Devil's Paradise: A British-Owned Congo." In response, chargé d'affaires for the Peruvian legation in London, Eduardo Lembcke, fully denied these allegations in defense of Arana's Company, stating that it was impossible for his government to not have known about atrocities occurring in the Putumayo. Lembcke claimed that Saldaña's papers had been started for "dishonest purposes, and for that reason were so short-lived." Additionally, Lembcke said that Saldaña disappeared when libel charges were proceeding against him.

Paternoster later pointed out that while Saldaña was actively publishing his Iquitos newspapers, he filed a "'denunciation or indictment' to the local court against the Company and its predecessors. Saldaña received no official reply, and the court later issued a writ where they declared themselves "incompetent to act." The apparent proof that the denunciation was made to the courts, was that Saldaña made the contents of his criminal petition public. Paternoster also noted that no proceedings were ever made against Saldaña, his publications, or another newspaper named La Presna which reprinted Saldaña's work. Paternoster emphasized that even if Saldaña's evidence was to be regarded as a pack of lies, Hardenburg and his friend Walter Perkins were still eyewitnesses of atrocities and testified to a condition of lawlessness in the Putumayo.

The public reaction to the revelations included in Paternoster's article led to the London directors of the Peruvian Amazon Company sending an investigatory commission to the Putumayo in 1910. The British Foreign Office took the opportunity to attach Roger Casement to the commission, who had previously exposed atrocities occurring in the Congo Free State in the pursuit of rubber extraction. Documents from Benjamin Saldaña and Walter Hardenburg were used by Casement for background information while he was on the commission. Casement referred to this body of work as his "Police News" and cross referenced these documents at times when he met a criminal whose name he recognized.

The work started by Saldaña Rocca and continued by others, eventually led to multiple arrest warrants issued against employees of the Peruvian Amazon Company. The first issue of these took place on April 7, 1911 and charged 27 employees with the "crime of flogging and flaying thirty Ocainas Indians and then burning them alive." The next wave of warrants were issued against 215 employees of the La Chorrera branch, where the majority of crimes attested to in the Saldaña and Hardenburg depositions took place. The last round of warrants were issued against Pablo Zumaeta and Victor Macedo. Most of these criminals were never arrested, and Zumaeta was even elected mayor of Iquitos in 1912,1914, and later between 1922 and 1923.

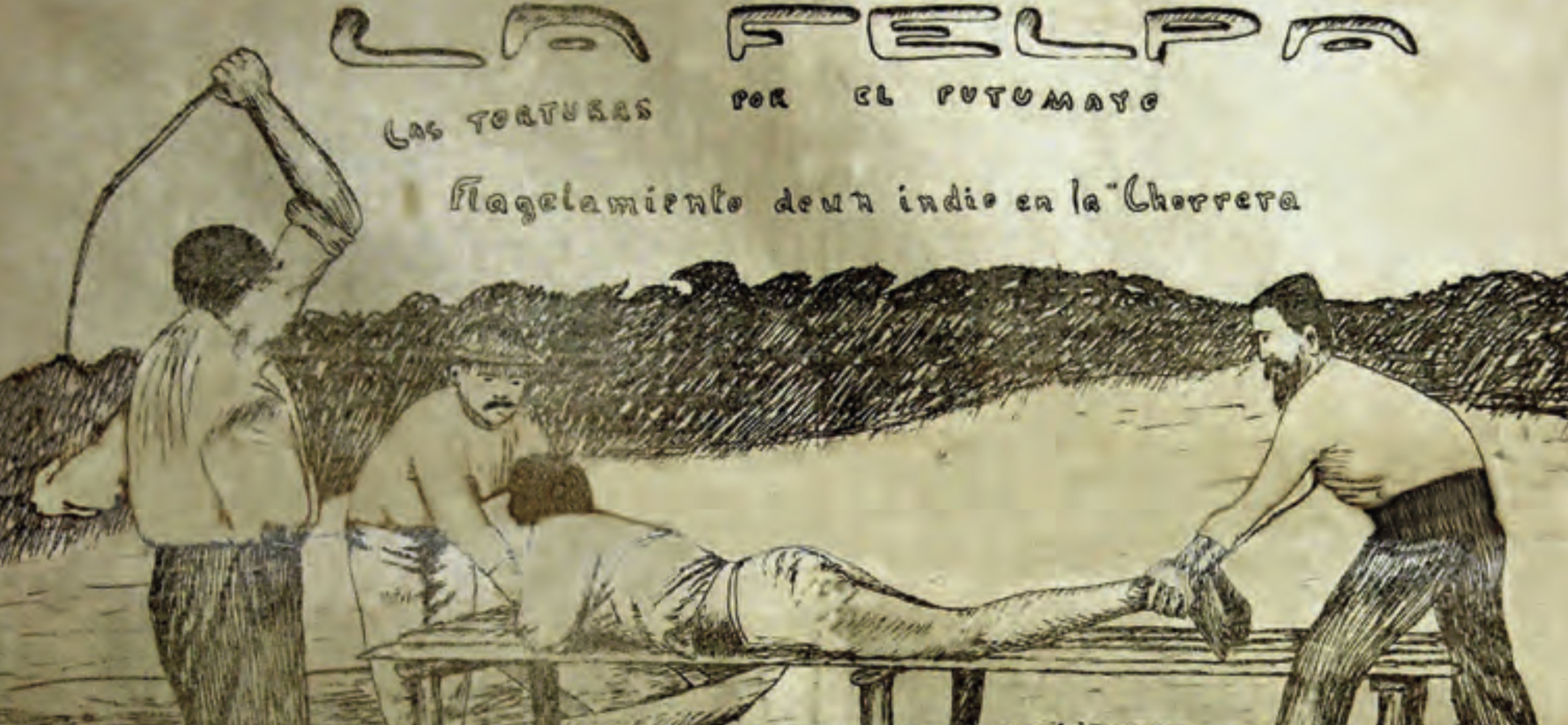
Illustration of flogging in the Putumayo, published by La Felpa.

Saldaña reportedly lived poor and destitute in Lima before his murder at the age of 52 on April 17, 1912. On July 8, 1912, an anti-Arana newspaper named La Presna published an article that was partially an obituary, and part editorial which further denounced Arana. One sentence from the paper stated "that humble defender of Right and Humanity had to fly from Loreto and died miserably in a wretched hole in order that he should not in his turn be the victim of the criminal exploiters of that river." La Presna also insinuated that the Putumayo issue was not a challenge to Peruvian patriotism, which was suggested by Arana's defenders, but instead that it was a "great National shame."

With the help of Benjamin Saldaña's work, Walter Ernest Hardenburg collected twenty testimonials from people that had worked in the Putumayo. Eventually in December 1912, these accounts were published in "The Putumayo, the Devil's Paradise." The public outcry that originated from the work of Saldaña, Hardenburg, Paternoster, and Roger Casement helped play a role in the Peruvian Amazon Company's liquidation, which occurred in 1913. Unfortunately for the Putumayo Natives, Julio César Arana as well as a number of his administrators never faced justice. Arana and Miguel S. Loayza retained property in the region, which effectively translated into them keeping control over their Native work force.

Researcher and writer Mario Vargas Llosa stated that "There is no way to find testimonies of the last years of Benjamin Saldaña Rocca in Lima." The Bodleian Library, at Oxford retains a mostly complete set of Saldaña's La Felpa and La Sancion newspapers, archived as N.2343 b.10.

== See also ==
- Julio César Arana
- Peruvian Amazon Company
- Putumayo genocide
- Roger Casement

== Bibliography ==
- Goodman, Jordan (2009). The Devil and Mr. Casement: One Man's Battle for Human Rights in South America's Heart of Darkness. Farrar, Straus and Giroux. ISBN 978-1429936392.
- Slavery in Peru: Message from the President of the United States Transmitting Report of the Secretary of State, with Accompanying Papers, Concerning the Alleged Existence of Slavery in Peru. United States. Department of State. 1913.
- Hardenburg, Walter (1912). The Putumayo, the Devil's Paradise; Travels in the Peruvian Amazon Region and an Account of the Atrocities Committed Upon the Indians Therein. Putumayo: London: Fischer Unwin. p. 200. ISBN 1372293019. Also available via Wikisource.
- Hardenburg, Walter (1912). Transcript of 'The Devil's Paradise. / A catalogue of crime' by W. E. Hardenburg. National Library of Ireland.
