= El Encanto =

- Municipality and town
- Location of the municipality and town of El Encanto in the Amazonas Department of Colombia

- Location in Ecuador
- Coordinates: 1°46′44″S 73°12′38″W
- Country: Colombia
- Department: Amazonas

Area
  - Total: 10,724 km^{2} (4,141 sq mi)

Population (2005)
  - Total: 4,376
- Time zone: UTC-5 (Colombia Standard Time)
- Climate: Af

El Encanto is a town and municipality in the Amazonas Department of Colombia. It is located in the mouth of the Cara Paraná River, a tributary of the Putumayo River (Içá). El Encanto can be reached by air or river. The local navy base has a runway available only to military and official planes, established during the Colombia-Peru War. By river the closest towns with airport access are Puerto Arturo, Peru from downstream, and Puerto Leguízamo (Putumayo Department, Colombia) upstream.

The majority of the inhabitants in the area are Huitotos indigenous tribes. The municipality has an area of 10,724 square kilometres or 4,141 square miles. In 2005, it had a population of 4,376 people.

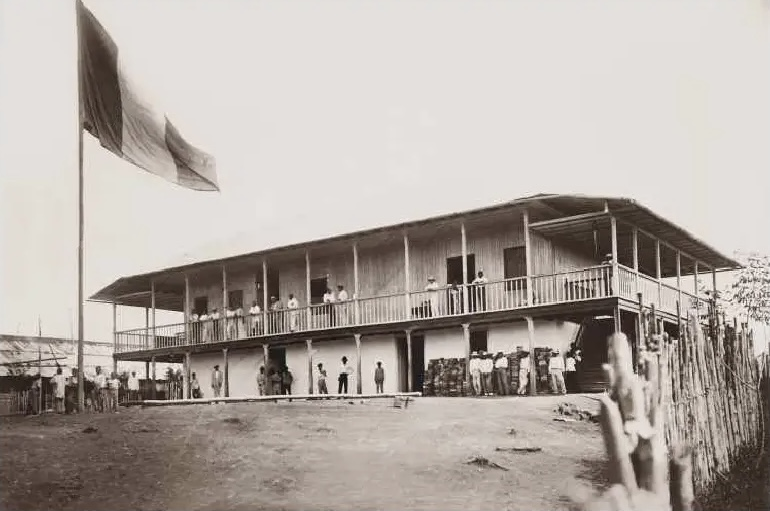
'The main house at El Encanto, belonging to Miguel S. Loayza: manager of the El Encanto station. The Peruvian flag flies in the top left.'

== History ==
El Encanto was founded shortly before the 1900s by rubber tappers looking to take advantage of the local natives as a work force. The rubber boom had drastic effects in the Putumayo region, where El Encanto is located. The land owned by Arana was split into two 'departments': La Chorrera on the Igaraparaná and El Encanto, headquarters for sections on the Caraparaná. By 1904, the settlement came under the control of Julio César Arana and what would become the Peruvian Amazon Company. The companies efforts to extract rubber and profit culminated in the Putumayo genocide: enslaving, abusing, starving, exhausting, and murdering local populations. At the time of Roger Casement's visit to the Putumayo, the station was under the control of Miguel S. Loayza.

Before the border of the Putumayo was changed thanks to the Salomón–Lozano Treaty: Julio Cesar Arana, Miguel S. Loayza, and Carlos Loayza initiated a series of forced migrations. Between 1922 and 1930 groups of natives from the right bank of the Putumayo were resettled in the Ampiyacu basin of Loreto, Peru: so the three of them could retain their work force. At least 6,719 indigenous people were moved from the region: and 50% of them died from disease.

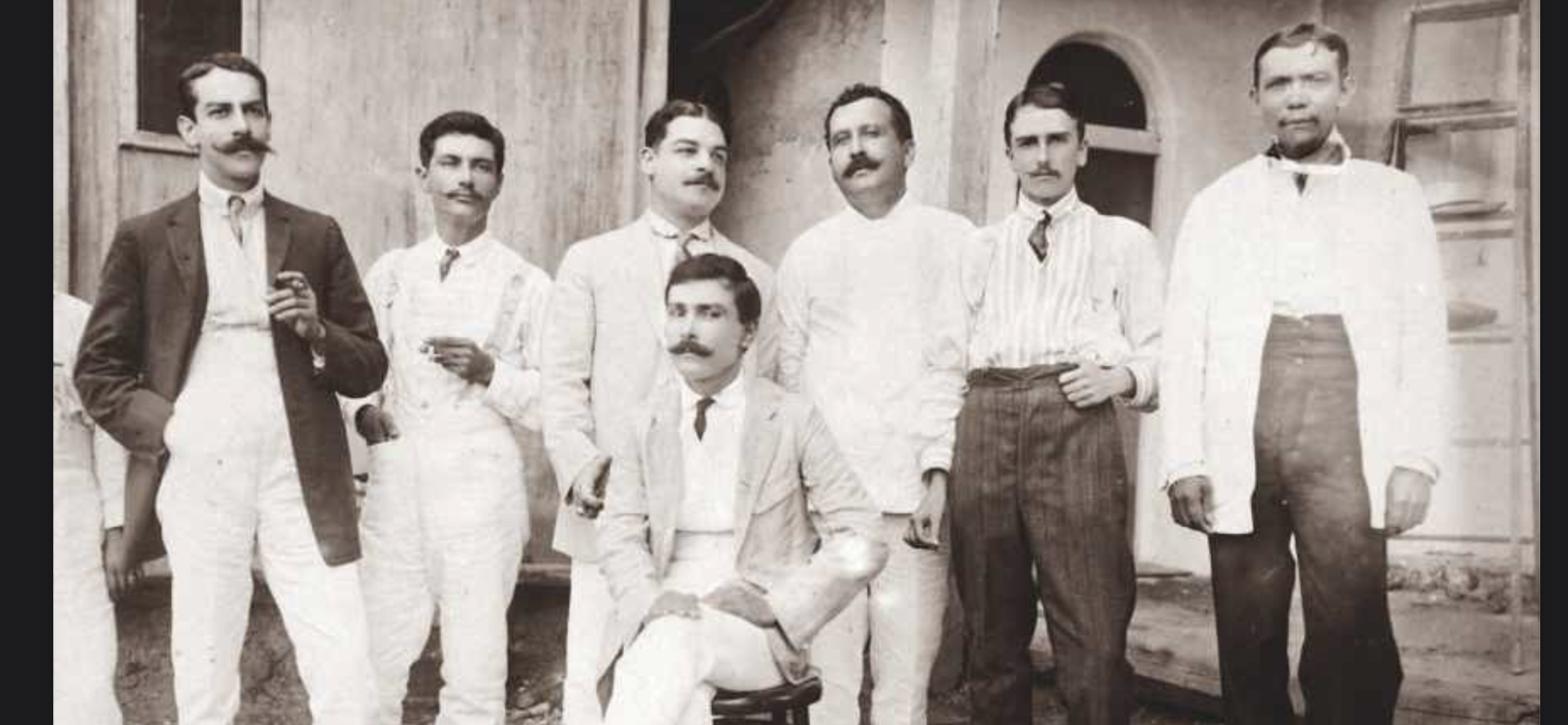
The administrators of El Encanto, with their boss Miguel S. Loayza (seated.)

== Climate ==
El Encanto has a tropical rainforest climate (Köppen Af) with heavy rainfall year-round.

Climate data for El Encanto
Month	Jan	Feb	Mar	Apr	May	Jun	Jul	Aug	Sep	Oct	Nov	Dec	Year
Mean daily maximum °C (°F)	31.3 (88.3)	31.6 (88.9)	31.2 (88.2)	31.4 (88.5)	31.4 (88.5)	31.0 (87.8)	29.7 (85.5)	29.8 (85.6)	30.8 (87.4)	31.1 (88.0)	31.2 (88.2)	31.5 (88.7)	31.0 (87.8)
Daily mean °C (°F)	26.6 (79.9)	26.7 (80.1)	26.5 (79.7)	26.5 (79.7)	26.7 (80.1)	25.6 (78.1)	25.4 (77.7)	25.8 (78.4)	26.2 (79.2)	26.4 (79.5)	27.1 (80.8)	26.6 (79.9)	26.3 (79.4)
Mean daily minimum °C (°F)	22.0 (71.6)	21.8 (71.2)	21.8 (71.2)	21.7 (71.1)	22.4 (72.3)	21.5 (70.7)	21.0 (69.8)	20.9 (69.6)	21.3 (70.3)	22.2 (72.0)	23.1 (73.6)	21.8 (71.2)	21.8 (71.2)
Average rainfall mm (inches)	210.7 (8.30)	230.2 (9.06)	303.3 (11.94)	341.6 (13.45)	333.1 (13.11)	293.7 (11.56)	250.4 (9.86)	229.1 (9.02)	183.3 (7.22)	197.4 (7.77)	256.3 (10.09)	236.2 (9.30)	3,065.3 (120.68)
Average rainy days	14	14	17	16	19	19	17	14	14	14	15	15	188
Source 1: IDEAM
Source 2: Climate-Data.org
