= La Chorrera, Colombia =

La Chorrera ɨ́meje
- Municipality and town
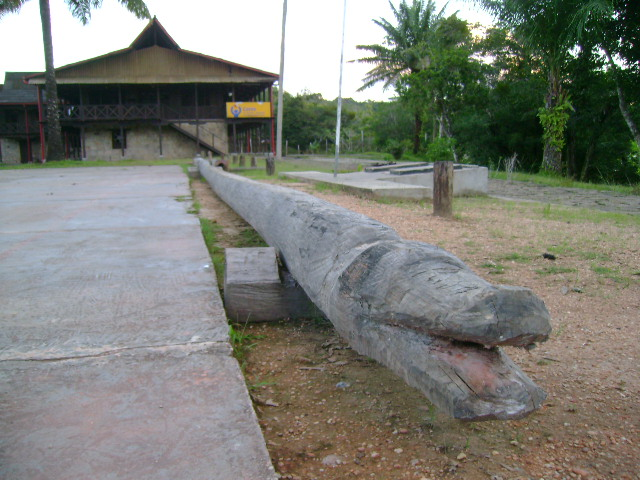

- Location of the municipality and town of La Chorrera in the Amazonas Department of Colombia

- Location in Colombia
- Coordinates: 1°26′49″S 72°47′40″W
- Country: Colombia
- Department: Amazonas Department

Area
  - Total: 12,670 km^{2} (4,890 sq mi)
- Climate: Af

La Chorrera (Muinane: ɨ́meje) is a town and municipality in the southern Colombian Department of Amazonas. The population is largely engaged in agricultural production, hunting, fishing, and banana and cassava growing. The municipality was once a notable site for rubber production: exploited by the Peruvian Julio César Arana, who owned the Peruvian Amazon Company at the turn of the 20th century, north of the Putumayo River. The territory has an area of 12,670 km².

== History ==
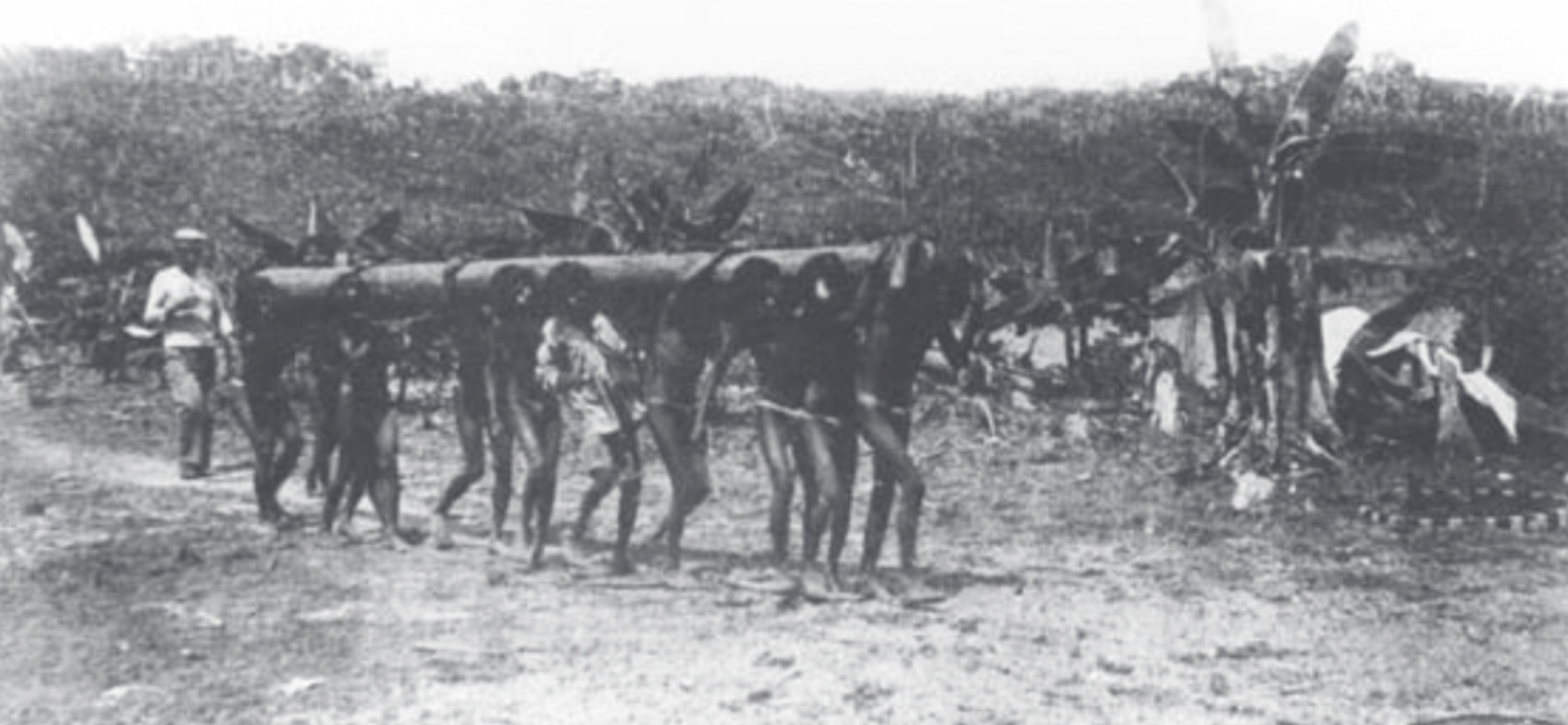
A group of Huitoto natives, forced to work at ‘Colonia India.’

La Chorrera is located below a steep cataract of the Igaraparaná river. The settlement itself was built on a high bank of the river, and started off as a rubber planation. It was originally founded by Colombians Crisóstomo Hernandez & Benjamin Larrañaga around 1898 with the name ‘Colonia India’. Originally the two were cinchona (quina) collectors, but switched their attention to rubber in the Putumayo after the collapse of the Cinchona boom. Julio Arana entered the region in 1896, soon forming a partnership with Benjamin and Rafael Larrañaga, forming Larrañaga, Arana y compañia. For his future endeavors, Arana followed the example of the Colombians who had worked the local natives into a debt bondage system that would become synonymous with slavery.

One of the first documented massacres of the Putumayo genocide happened at La Chorrera in September 1903. During the birthday of his sister in law, Rafael Larrañaga, assisted by employees of the company, flogged, shot and killed 25 natives, burning some of the survivors alive. These victims were guilty of not gathering enough rubber to meet a quota. After Benjamin Larrañaga's death on December 21, 1903, Arana bought out Larrañaga's sons' share from the company, "taking advantage of their ignorance and stupidity to rob them scandalously." By this time, Julio C. Arana was in control over the Igaraparaná river, and, after taking of El Encanto from the Calderón Hermanos, Arana became the sole master of the Putumayo. All of the rubber collected by Arana's firm along the Igaraparaná was sent to La Chorrera, where it was then sent to Iquitos. In 1906, the manager Victor Macedo issued an order "to kill all mutilated Indians at once for the following reasons: first, because they consumed food although they could not work; and second, because it looked bad to have these mutilated wretches running about." Separation of families, slavery, constant flogging, target practice on humans, murders, various methods of torture, and the violation of little girls were common under the rubber company.

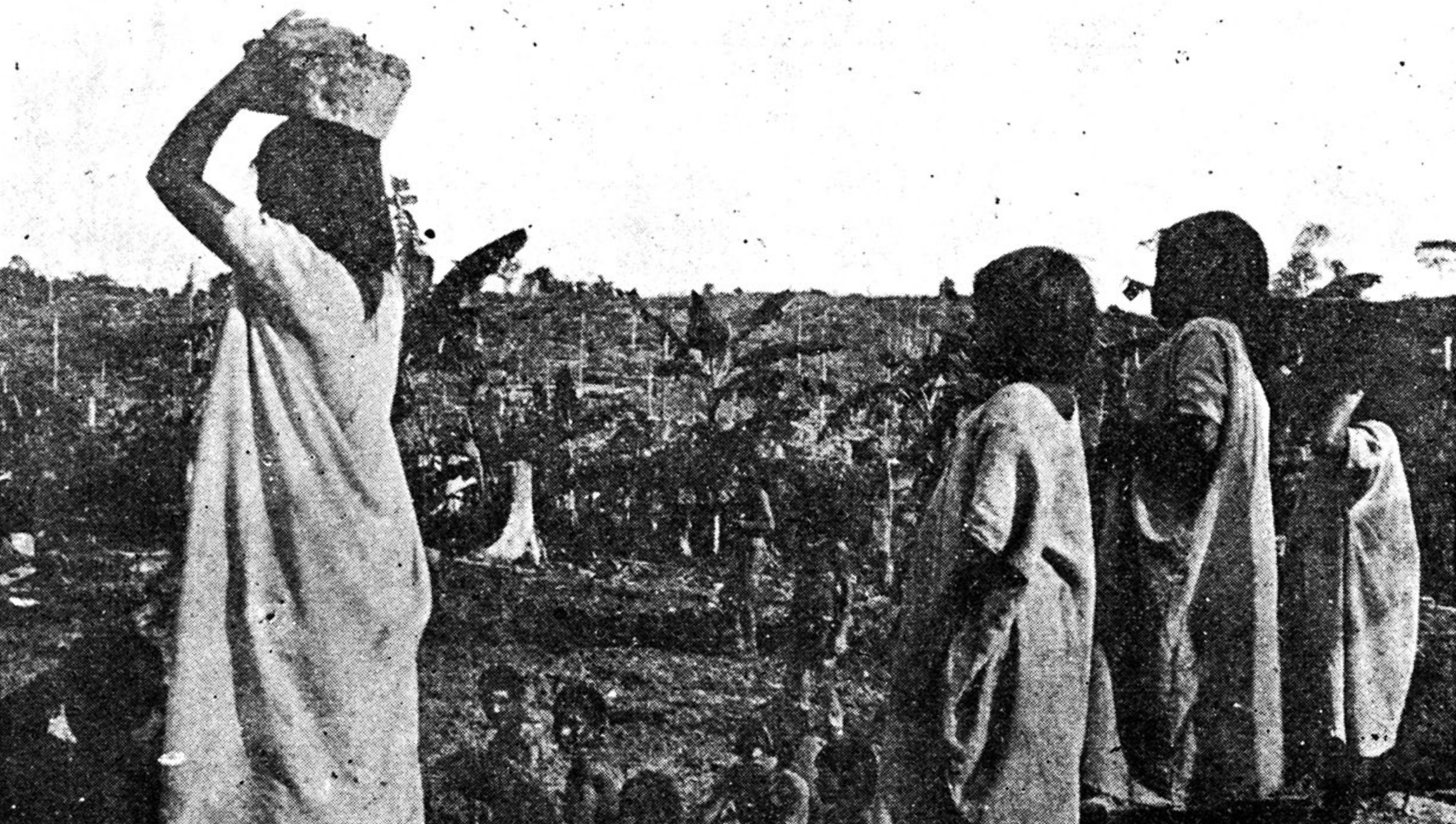
Carrying materials for construction at La Chorrera

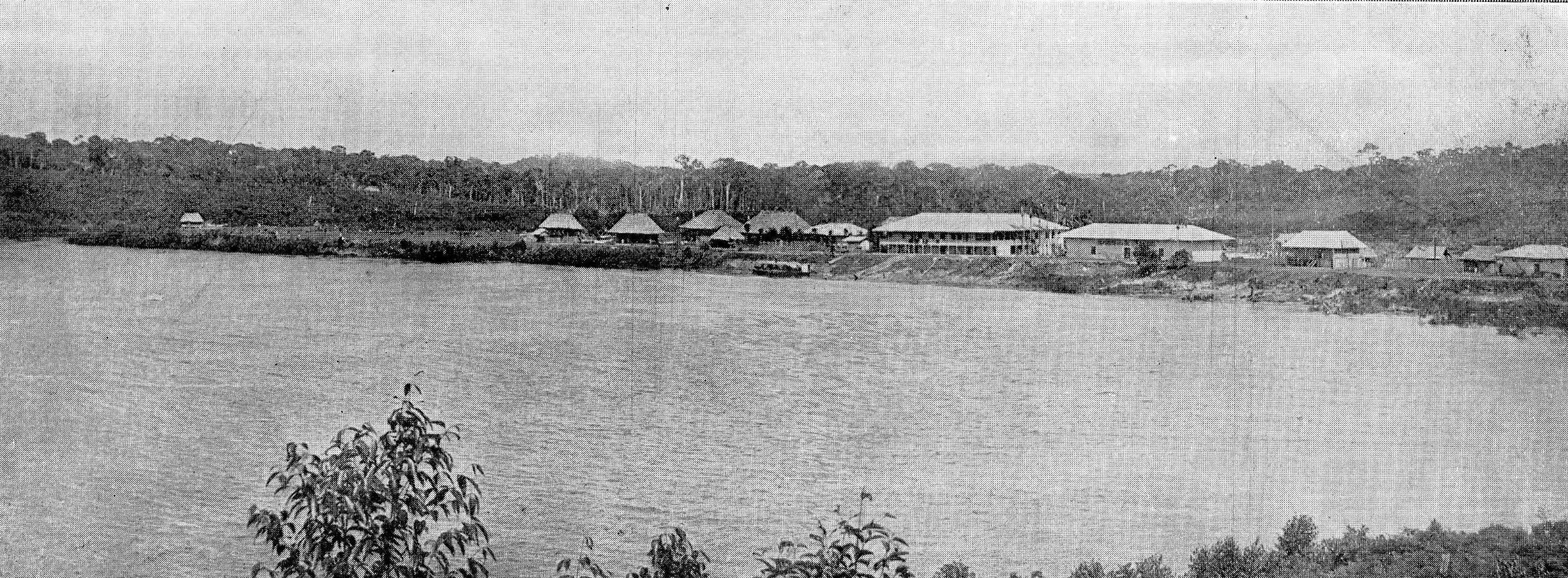
Photograph of La Chorrera in 1924.
