= Cara Paraná River =

Location
- Country: Colombia

Physical characteristics
- Length: 260 km
- Basin size: 7,265.9 km2

Cara Paraná River is a river of Colombia. It is part of the Amazon River basin and is a right tributary of the Putumayo River.

== See also ==
- List of rivers of Colombia
