= Emberá people =

Indigenous people of Panama and Colombia

Emberá
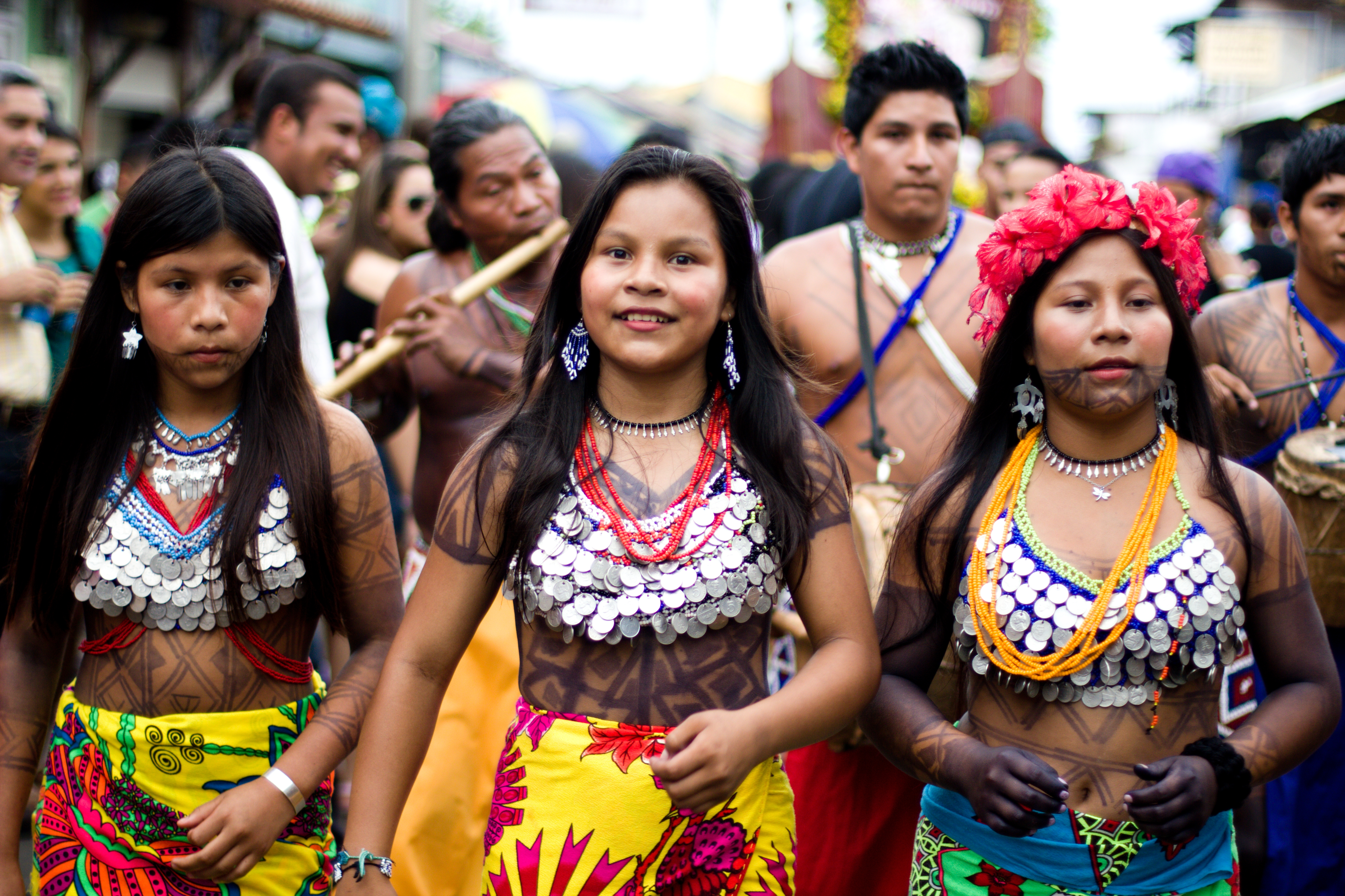
- An Emberá parade held in Chitré

Total population
- ~240,000

Regions with significant populations
- Colombia: 196,115 (2018)
- Panama: 51,657 (2023)

Languages
- Northern Emberá, Emberá-Catío, Emberá-Chamí, Emberá-Baudó, Eperara, Spanish

Religion
- Evangelicism, jaí

Related ethnic groups
- Wounaan

The Emberá, also known in the historical literature as the Chocó or Katío Indians, are an Indigenous people of Panama and Colombia. Together with the Wounaan (or Waunana) they are part of the Emberá-Wounaan group. In the Emberá languages, the word ẽberá can be used to mean person, man, or Indigenous person, depending on the context in which it is used.

== Language ==
The Emberá language is not a single language but a group of mutually-intelligible languages spoken throughout Panamá and Colombia. Along with Wounmeu, they are the only extant members of the Chocó language family and not known to be related to any other language family of Central or South America, although in the past relationships have been proposed with the Carib, Arawak, and Chibchan language families.

An established Emberá alphabet has been officially recognized by the government of Panama, consisting of:

- 6 oral vowels (a, e, i, o, u, ʌ)
- 6 nasal vowels (ã, ẽ, ĩ, õ, ũ, ʌ̃)
- 21 consonants (b, b̶, ch, d, d̶, dy, g, j, k, l, m, n, p, r, rr, s, t, v, w, y, z).

To date, there have been very few books published in the Emberá language. These are mostly educational materials produced by Panama's education ministry (MEDUCA) or by Christian missionaries. The most significant of these to date is a Bible translation containing the New Testament and parts of the Old Testament titled Ãcõrẽ Be~~d~~ea, "the word of God." The following is an excerpt from the book of Matthew:

18 Jesucrito tod̶ara nãwã b̶asia: dji papa Mariara Jose ume dji edad̶i carea bed̶ea bia panasid̶aa. Baribʌrʌ dji edad̶i naẽna Mariara Ãcõrẽ Jaured̶eba b̶iogoa b̶esia. 19 Dji quima Josera ẽberã jipa b̶asia. Maʌ̃ bẽrã Mariara jũmarã quĩrãpita biẽ́ jara amaaba chupea igara quĩrĩã b̶asia. 20 Mãwã crĩcha b̶ʌd̶e bajãnebema nezocada cãĩmocarad̶eba Josemaa zeped̶a nãwã jarasia: –Jose, David̶eba zed̶a, Maria edaira wayarãdua, idjira Ãcõrẽ Jaured̶ebabʌrʌ b̶iogoa b̶ʌ bẽrã. 21 Mariaba warrada toya. Maʌ̃ warraba idji purura ãdji cadjiruad̶ebemada ẽdrʌ edaya. Maʌ̃ bẽrã idjira trʌ̃ b̶ʌdua Jesu.

— Matthew 1:18-21

Words from the Emberá language are marked in this article in parentheses and italicized. For example, woman (wẽra) or shaman (jaibaná).

== Geography ==
The Emberá people mostly live in the Chocó department of western Colombia and in Panama. For the Panamanian Emberá, the Chocó and its river systems remain their ancestral homelands, and the different dialects of the Emberá language still mostly correspond to different parts of that area and its river systems.

== History ==
=== History of the Emberá in Panama ===
In the late 1700s, the Emberá began migrating from the Choco region to modern-day Colombia to what is currently the Darién province of Panama, which had been home to the Tule or Guna people at the time of European contact. This migration was prompted by the Spanish, and took the form of a conflict between the Emberá and the Guna, moving the latter into the lands along the Caribbean coast which now form the Comarca Guna Yala and San Blas Islands. The Darién has subsequently become recognized as the homelands of the Emberá in Panama, though they had also settled as far west as Lake Gatún and the riverine areas of what would become the Canal Zone.

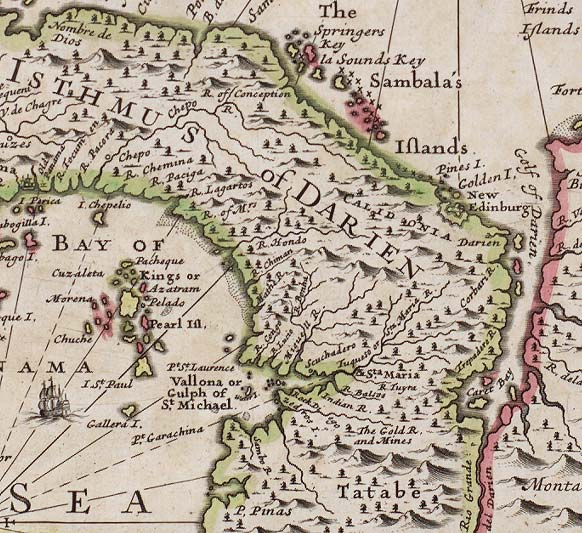
A map of the Darién isthmus, 1699.

During the 19th century, during which it was part of the Gran Republica de Colombia, the Darién was inhabited almost exclusively by the Indigenous Emberá and Guna peoples along with the descendants of escaped African slaves, known as darienitas or libres. Typically, darienitas settled in port towns at the mouths of rivers while the Emberá would live along the rivers downstream. This historical trend is still reflected in the current regional demographics; many port towns have retained their darienita identity, such as La Palma, Yaviza and Garachine, while many contemporary Emberá towns are found downstream along the rivers.

Panama seceded from the Republic of Colombia, achieving its independence in 1903. However, Eastern Panama still remained isolated and undeveloped during this time. While trade with the darienitas increased the access that the Emberá had to resources such as off-board motors, kerosene lamps, hunting rifles, and other modern commodities which would change their daily lives, major changes started taking place in the 1950s and 1960s. This period observed the influence of missionaries and the involvement of the revolutionary government of Omar Torrijos, who actively sought to integrate the Indigenous population of Darién into Panamanian society by encouraging them to settle into communities for access to government-sponsored services such as schools and health centers. This initiated the transition of the Emberá people, who until that time had lived dispersed in small family units throughout the rainforest, into settled communities.

The Darién province changed dramatically with the construction of the Pan-American highway into the province as far as Yaviza. Before the creation of the highway, the dominant if not exclusive mode of trade and transportation between Panama City and the Darién was by boat. The construction of this highway through a previously untraversable terrain had a number of significant effects. Farmers from the interior of the country, often called interioranos, began to migrate into the Darién in large numbers, effecting demographic shifts and an unprecedented scale of logging and deforestation for the purpose of establishing cattle ranches. It also shifted the economic and political centers of the province from the coastal darienita cities to the new towns being established along the highway by these settlers.

== Social organization ==
=== Transition from dispersed settlement to villages, towns, and urban neighborhoods ===
Historically, the Emberá lived in a dispersed settlement pattern along the river systems of Panamá and Colombia. Since the 1960s, the majority of Emberá have transitioned to settled communities and urban areas. Herlihy describes the pre-1950s settlement pattern:

Traditional Chocó settlement consists of dispersed household units in a distinctive riverine pattern ... The extended family serv[ed] as the settlement unit. No villages or large agglomerations of dwellings exist[ed]. Thatched-roof, pile-dwellings are scattered along the river margin, usually constructed on levee tops and high alluvial terraces. Population density changes from one river to another, but houses are generally situated at least several hundred meters from one another, with intervening forests and river bends blocking the view of a neighbor's house. Settlement density is usually greatest where occupation periods have been longest.

The Emberá began forming the first small villages in the 1950s, in what has been described as a "slow, almost evolutionary process." Economic considerations, Western influence, and the presence of religious missionaries were influential factors in the first settlements of Emberá communities. Accounts also exist of a foreigner known by his nickname "Perú," a mysterious and legendary figure who tried to convince the Emberá to settle into colonies.

He instructed them that... through the formation of villages they could solicit government officials to provide teachers, schools, and medical supplies. He told them that through more effective occupation of their traditional lands, they could obtain a [semi-autonomous territory] like the one of the Cuna Indians of Panama's San Blas Islands, guaranteeing them legal rights to land and resources. As a result, among the Darién Chocó Perú is a larger-than-life romantic folk figure.

By the late 1960s, the government of Omar Torrijos was promoting the settlement of the Darién Emberá into communities; the first formal establishment of an Emberá town was in 1963 along the Rio Balsas river. In 1985, it was estimated that 25 percent of Emberá people in Panamá still lived according to the traditional dispersed settlement pattern. However, life in settled communities is now considered the norm, or "typical" of most Emberá.

In addition to these settled communities, many Emberá now also live in urban areas. According to the 2010 Panamanian National Census, over one third of Panamanian Emberá people live in the central province of Panamá, and over 25% of the total Panamanian Emberá population reside in urban districts of Panama City.

=== Female genital mutilation in Emberá culture ===
The Emberá like some other Indigenous tribes in Latin America are known to practice female genital mutilation (FGM). The tradition was extremely secretive and taboo until a 2007 incident, in which a girl died as a result of FGM. The incident caused much controversy, raised awareness and stimulated debate about ending the practice altogether. In 2015, it was reported that of the approximately 250,000 members of the tribe, 25,000 (10%) had decided to discontinue FGM, with a community leader saying they hoped to eradicate it by 2030.

=== Riverine lifestyle and housing ===
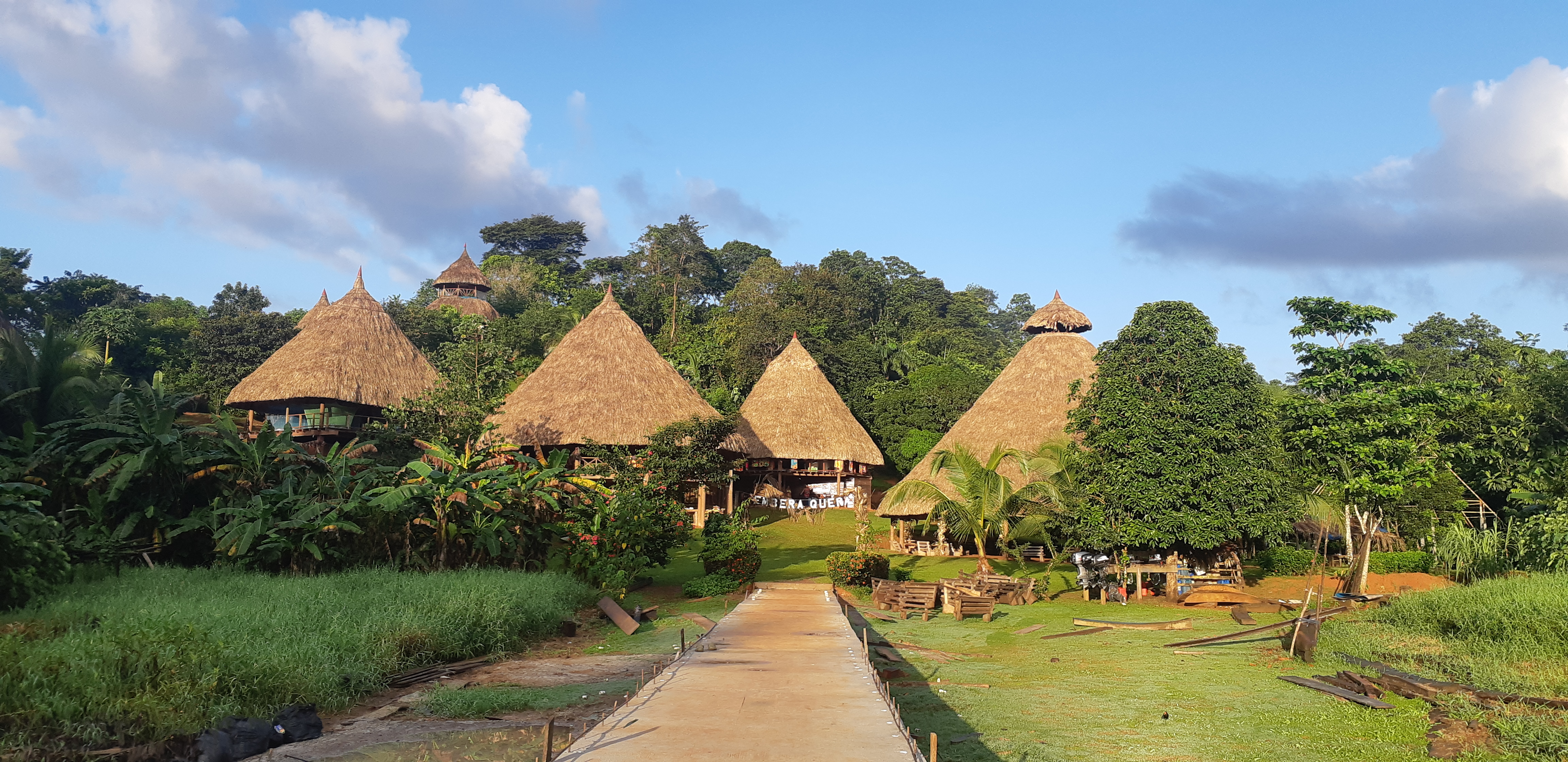
Emberá Quera

The Emberá are a riverine people, historically building their houses along the banks of rivers. Although now most all Emberá people live in villages, towns, or urban centers, many established Emberá communities are still found along riverbanks. The designated autonomous region, the Comarca Emberá-Wounaan, is split up into two territories surrounding two of the Darién's major river systems, the Sambú and Chucunaque. The word for river in both the Emberá and Wounaan languages is dó, noticeable in the names of many of the rivers and towns in the Chocó department of Colombia, such as the Baudó river, as well as the capital of the department itself, Quibdó.

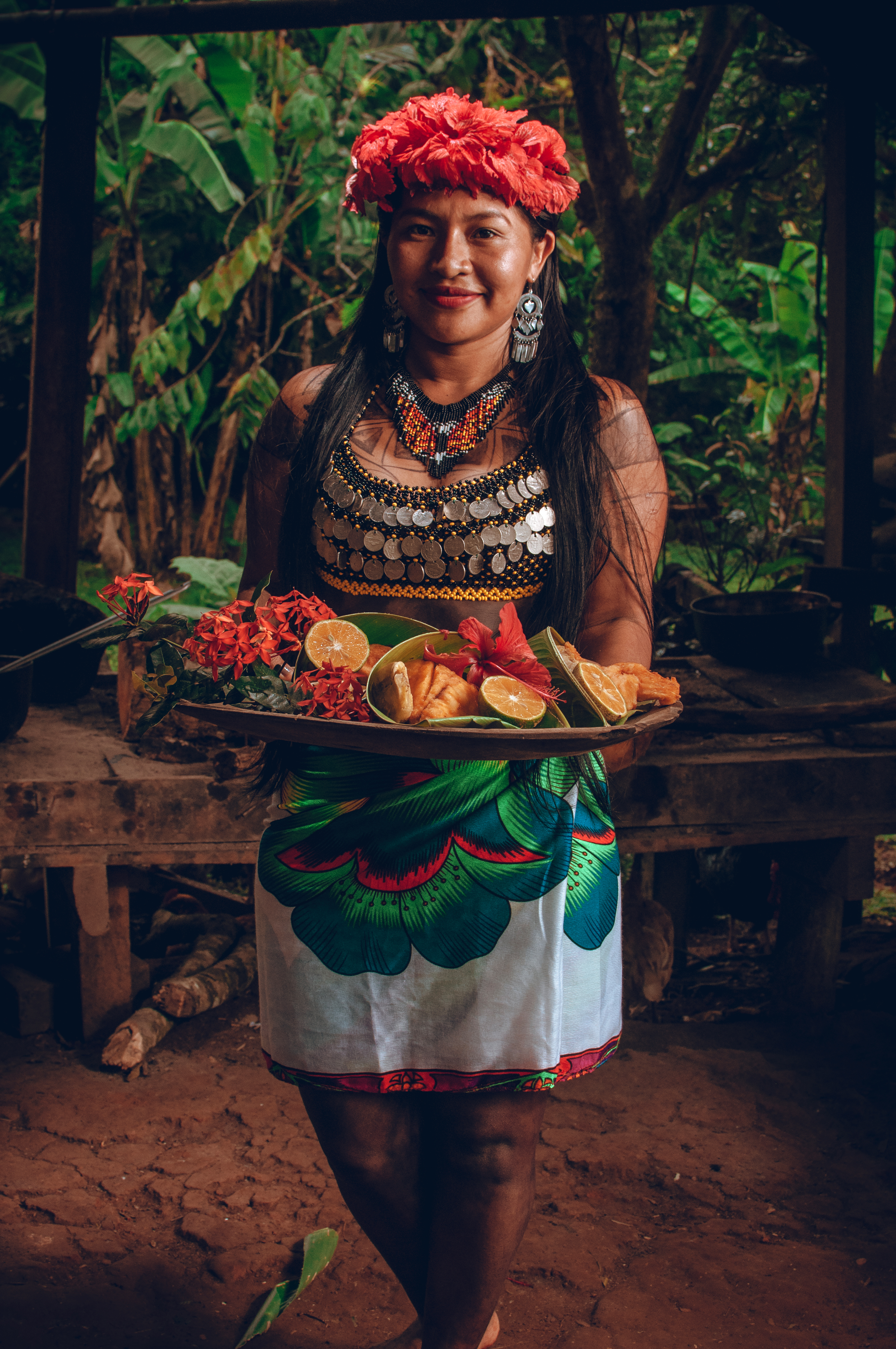
An Emberá woman with a tray of food

An Emberá canoe

Fish (bedá) are an important staple of the Emberá diet along with plantains (patá), and rivers play a central role in daily life for fishing, bathing, transport, and many domestic chores. Boats have also played important roles in Emberá tradition and cosmology. The craft of constructing dugout canoes (hampá) was historically a very significant skill for Emberá men, at times serving as a rite of passage or prerequisite for marriage according to oral history. Ethnographic records detail the ways in which boats take on an anthropomorphic character in the Emberá language and philosophy, and traditionally people were even buried in canoes. Anthropologists have written about how central rivers are to the worldview of both the Emberá and the Wounaan, a closely related group of people who, while having a distinct history and belief system from the Emberá, share much with them linguistically, historically, and culturally. In addition to changes in settlement patterns, the form of typical Emberá housing is actively going through a period of change. A traditional Emberá house can be described as an open-air dwelling raised 6–12 feet off the ground on stilts with thatched roofing made from palm leaves (often, but not exclusively, Sabal mauritiiformis) and flooring made from the bark of the jira palm (épa). These houses were typically round in shape and large enough to hold members of an extended family group. Logs with notches cut in them (domé) were used as ladders to enter/exit the house, and could be turned with the notches facing inwards to signal that people were busy, not home, or to keep animals from climbing into the house. The space under the house would be used as a dry space to carry out domestic chores or keep animals.

Contemporary Emberá housing style often employs many of the traditional materials and styles. However, they may often be smaller due to a comparatively smaller number of family members per house. Wooden boards often replace the jira bark as flooring, and durable aluminum roofing in place of palm leaves. Due to living in settled communities with other unrelated people, walls have become more common for added privacy, whereas walls were historically very uncommon. Propane stoves often replace or complement the traditional cooking fire. Some contemporary Emberá houses have both a larger structure of wooden floors and walls with metal roofing on a cement foundation, with an attached, more traditional thatched-roof structure for use as a kitchen. Many now live in cinder-block houses in the typical Panamanian style, if they have the access to the resources and infrastructure to rent or build one.

== Political organization ==
Historically, the Emberá people were described as having a fundamentally egalitarian social and political organization:

Ethnographic accounts and oral history indicate that since colonial times, [Emberá] social structure has been egalitarian, with no formal tribal leaders, chiefs, councils, or a structure of elders. Certain religious beliefs and ceremonial activities center on the shaman who, with an intimate knowledge of the medicinal, toxicologic and hallucinogenic properties of the surrounding plant and animal world, cures through exorcising malignant spirits. Yet, in terms of political, economic, or interpersonal relationships, no individual holds special leadership status.

=== Political organization of the Panamanian Emberá ===
Part of Omar Torrijos's efforts to organize the Indigenous people of the Darién was through the establishment of the first National Indian Congress in 1968. The Emberá were encouraged to self-organize and form political leadership in the same way the Guna people had done, and a Guna chief was even appointed to aid them in the process. Throughout the 1970s, more and more Emberá families continued settling into communities and towns. By 1980, discussions were taking place about the establishment of a comarca indigena, or autonomous territory, for the Emberá within the Darién province.

in November 1983, the National Assembly of Panama ratified the ley 22, establishing the Comarca Emberá-Wounaan, a territory of 4383.5 km^{2} encompassing two non-contiguous districts, Sambú and Cemaco, whose capital is the town of Unión Chocó. The law established the territory under a collective land title of the Emberá and Wounaan peoples. The leadership structure, officially known as the Congreso General Emberá Wounaan de la Comarca, has a cacique general as its head. In addition, each district has a regional cacique, and individual communities also elect local caciques as their representatives at the annual General Congress of the Comarcá. The establishment of the Comarca conferred on the Indigenous population legal protection of their land from the encroachment of Latino cattle-ranchers, as well as a certain degree of self-governance.

== See also ==
- Indigenous peoples of Panama
- Indigenous peoples of Colombia
- Embera languages
- Chocó department
- Darién Province
