= Cueva language =

Extinct language of Panama

Cueva
- cueva
- Native to: Panama
- Region: Darién
- Ethnicity: Cueva people
- Extinct: c. 1535
- Language family: Chocoan: Woun Meu–Cueva; Cueva

Language codes
- ISO 639-3: None (mis)
- Glottolog: cuev1238
- Original distribution of the Cueva language

Cueva (Cueva: cueva) is an extinct Chocoan language of Panama. Only around 50 words are known in the language. It is often misclassified within linguistic studies. The Cueva people experienced a significant population decline between 1510 and 1535 due to conflicts, diseases, and the effects of Spanish colonization. By the 17th and 18th centuries, the Guna and Embera had migrated into the lands of the former Cueva speaking polities, repopulating the area.

== History ==
The Cueva were organized into at least 17 polities in 1515, all of them friendly with the Spaniards, all of whom presided over their own province and people.

== Classification ==
Loukotka mistakenly identified a Guna vocabulary from the Darién as Cueva, leading to confusion of Cueva with Guna in subsequent literature, with some authors reporting that Cueva was a dialect of or ancestral to the Guna language.

Loewen, Quesada Pacheco, and Constenla Umaña & Margery Peña have suggested a connection between Cueva and the Chocoan family, with some classifying Cueva as a Chocoan language.

Citing the linguistic diversity in the western half of the Isthmus, Calvo and Arias argue that Cueva could have been a lingua franca to connect an area with large linguistic diversity of both Chibchan and Chocoan languages because it includes cognates with both the Guna and Embera languages.

== Phonology ==
A reconstruction of Cueva phonology is presented below.

=== Consonants ===
		Bilabial	Alveolar	Palatal	Velar	Glottal
Occlusive	voiceless	p	t		k	
Occlusive	voiced (tense?)	b			g	
Fricative			s			h
Affricate				tʃ		
Nasal		m	n			
Lateral			l			
Tap			ɾ			
Glide				j	w	

=== Vowels ===
	Front	Central	Back	
	Front	Central	unrounded	rounded
High	i ĩ		ɯ	u ũ
Mid	e ẽ			o õ
Low		a ã		

The vowel /ɯ/ is posited based on phonetic correspondences between the Cueva letter ⟨y⟩ with the Woun Meu vowel /ɯ/, such as Cueva yra 'woman' with Woun Meu hɯɯy(a) 'id.'.

=== Phonotactics ===
The most common syllable structures in attested Cueva words are V, VV, VC, CV, CVV, CVC, and CCV.

== Morphology ==
=== Affixes ===
Attested prefixes in Cueva include tu- and es-, and suffixes include -ba, -ra, and -cha.

== Vocabulary ==
Only 50 words of Cueva are known, recorded by Gonzalo Fernández de Oviedo y Valdés in the early 16th century.

=== Influence on modern languages ===
The word chicha, referring to a fermented beverage commonly consumed in South America, is thought to originate from Cueva, as is the word Panama, said to mean 'fishing grounds, fishermen'.

=== Swadesh list ===
A Swadesh list of Cueva words is presented below.

Swadesh list of Cueva
No.	Gloss	Cueva
7	this	chi
32	small	saco, sacra
36	woman	yra
37	man	chuy
40	wife	espabe
45	fish	haboga
60	grass	y
65	bone	acla
77	tooth	-chry
93	to eat	chica
154	sea	pechry
183	new	chucre
185	good	merla
198	far	abaru

== Bibliography ==
- Lewis, M. Paul, ed. (2009). Ethnologue: languages of the world (16 ed.). Dallas, Tex: SIL International. ISBN 978-1-55671-216-6.
- Quesada Pacheco, Miguel Ángel (2024). La lengua cueva (Panamá, siglo XVI). LINCOM Studies in native american linguistics. München: LINCOM. ISBN 978-3-96939-174-7.
- Baquero, Alvaro (1987), "Los de la lengua de Cueva: Los grupos indígenas del istmo oriental en la época de la conquista española – por Kathleen Romoli (review)", Boletín Museo del Oro (in Spanish), 19, Museo del Oro: 141–142 – via Banrepcultural
- Adelaar, Willem F. H.; Muysken, Pieter (2004). The languages of the Andes. Cambridge language surveys. Cambridge, UK New York: Cambridge University Press. ISBN 978-0-511-48685-2.
- Campbell, Lyle (1997). American Indian languages: the historical linguistics of native America. Oxford studies in anthropological linguistics. New York Oxford: Oxford university press. ISBN 978-0-19-509427-5.
- Constela Umaña, Adolfo; Margery Peña, Enrique (1991). "Elementos de fonología comparada Chocó*". Revista de Filología y Lingüística de la Universidad de Costa Rica. 17 (1–2): 137. doi:10.15517/rfl.v17i1-2.20972. ISSN 2215-2628.
- Greenberg, Joseph Harold (1987). Language in the Americas. Stanford, Calif: Stanford university press. ISBN 978-0-8047-1315-3.
- Loewen, Jacob A. (July 1963). "Chocó I: Introduction and Bibliography". International Journal of American Linguistics. 29 (3): 239–263. doi:10.1086/464740. ISSN 0020-7071.
- Loukotka, Čestmír (1968). Wilbert, Johannes (ed.). Classification of South American Indian Languages (PDF) (4th ed.). Latin American Center, UCLA. ISBN 9780879031077.
- Romoli, Kathleen (1987). Los de la lengua de cueva: los grupos indígenas del istmo oriental en la época de la conquista española (in Spanish). Instituto Colombiano de Antropología. ISBN 978-958-601-116-7.
- Whitehead, Neil L. (1999), "The Crises and Transformations of Invaded Societies: The Caribbean (1492–1580)", in Salomon, Frank; Schwartz, Stuart B. (eds.), The Cambridge History of the Native Peoples of the Americas: Volume 3: South America, The Cambridge history of the Native Peoples of the Americas, vol. 3, Cambridge: Cambridge University Press, pp. 864–903, ISBN 978-0-521-63075-7
