= Pumé language =

Indigenous language spoken in Venezuela

Pumé
- Yaruro
- pũmɛ̃́ mãɛ̃́
- Native to: Venezuela
- Region: Apure
- Ethnicity: Pumé people
- Native speakers: 9,500 (2015)
- Language family: Language isolate

Language codes
- ISO 639-3: yae
- Glottolog: pume1238
- ELP: Yaruro
- Linguasphere: 81-KAA-aa
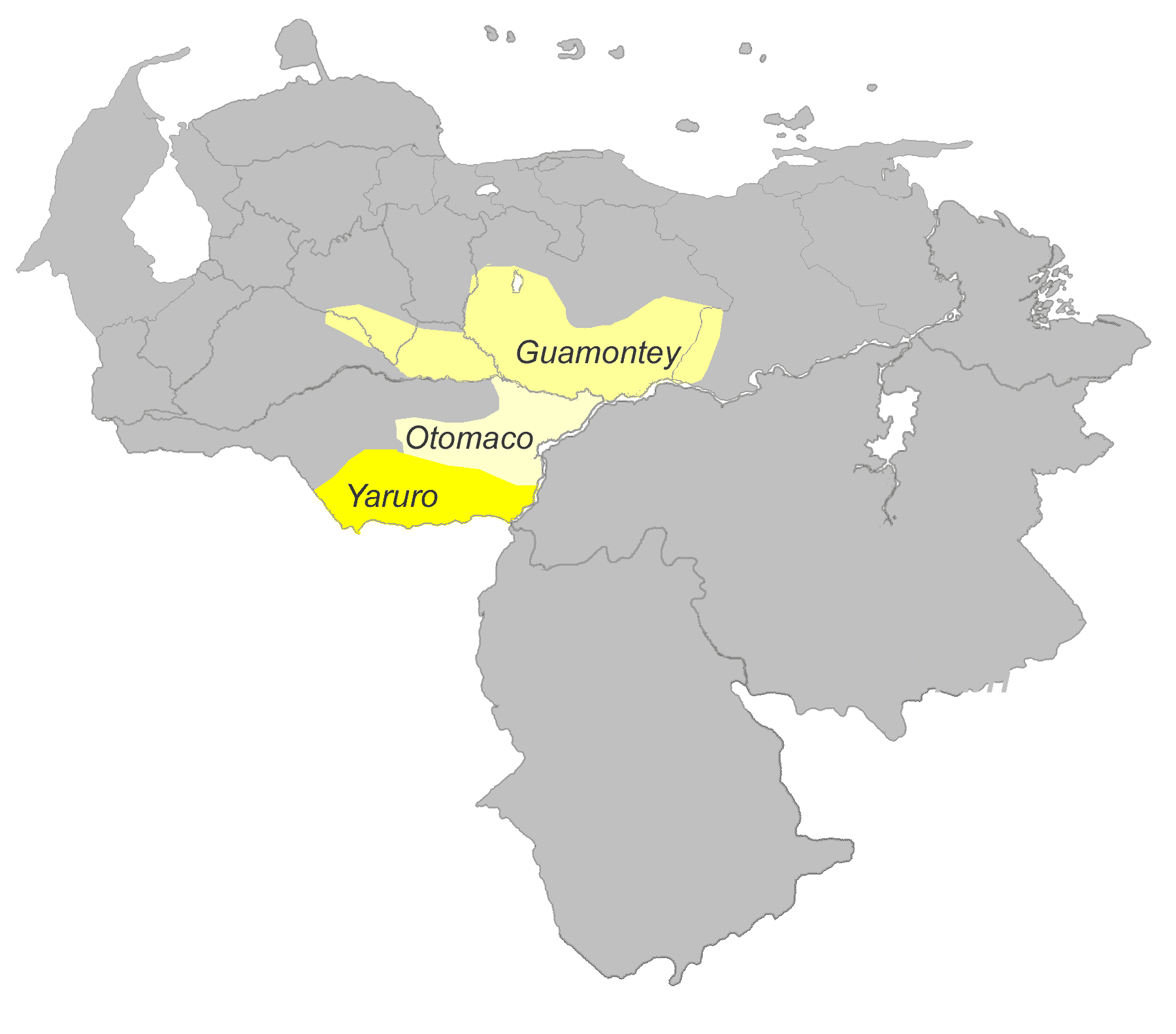
- Pumé

The Pumé language (also called Yuapín or Yaruro, also spelled Llaruro or Yaruru) is an indigenous language isolate spoken by 9,500 of the Pumé people, along the Orinoco, Cinaruco, Meta, and Apure rivers of Venezuela. It is not well classified; it may be distantly related to the extinct Esmeraldeño language or the Chocoan language family.

== Demographics ==
The Pumé people refer to their own language as pũmɛ̃́ mãɛ̃́, ‘language of the Pumé’. The language is vigorously spoken by approximately 9,500 people as of 2015. Speakers live in the central Apure Llanos of western Venezuela, mainly in the Arauca, Cunaviche, Capanaparo, and Cinaruco river areas. In Capuruchano subdivision, the Pumé do not live close to any rivers.

== Classification ==
Pumé has been considered a language isolate since Filippo Salvatore Gilii's 1782 book Saggio di storia americana. However, there have been a number of suggestions for its further linguistic affiliation with a number of families. Pache (2016) considers Pumé to be related to the Chocoan languages, citing evidence from lexical and sound correspondences. Some shared lexical items between Pumé and Chocoan (Pache (2016) cites Yaruro and Epena forms from the Intercontinental Dictionary Series):

Pumé	Chocoan
dac͡ço ‘eye, face,’ c͡ço ‘seed, fruit, nut’	Epena tautʰu ‘forehead’
da ‘eye’ (used in complex forms)	Proto-Chocoan **da ‘eye region,’ **da-ˈbu ‘eye,’ Epena ˈtau ‘eye’
duɾi ‘after’	Proto-Chocoan **duˈɾi ‘tail’
ɡõã ‘meat, flesh,’ goe ‘blood’	Proto-Emberá *uˈa ‘blood’
hu ‘bone,’ hu c͡çia ‘strong’	Proto-Chocoan **huˈa ‘arm, hand,’ Epena huaˈtau ‘strong’
i ‘skin’	Proto-Emberá *ˈe ‘skin’
ĩbu ‘nose’	Proto-Chocoan **kẽˈbu ‘nose’
ic͡çi ‘hand’	Epena iˈsia ‘wing’

== Language contact ==
Jolkesky (2016) notes that there are lexical similarities with the Saliba-Hodi, Arawak, Bora-Muinane, Choko, Witoto-Okaina, and Waorani language families due to contact.

English	Pumé	Hodi
village	bærʊ-pæ̃	balo
to drink	ui ‘water’	woi
to cut	koa	ʰkʷai
to lie down	ãrẽ	ʰjali
fire	kʰõdæ	ʰkule
brother	ajĩ-	hãjẽ ‘little brother’
"alligator" [caiman]	ari	aulẽ
cloud	ɡõãrã	kʷa
blood	ɡoe	iʰkwə
venom	ɲeetowe	jẽtohai
wasp	mu	mo
to go back/to walk	manau ‘to walk’; mana ‘way’	mãnã ‘to go back’

English	Pumé	Proto-Bora-Muinane
spider	mãkã	*paaɡa-
sweet potato	ʧerame	Muinane ʤírúúmɨba
snake	poana	*buua
smoke	ʧʰʊ	*ttsu
cassava	pae	*paikuumɯɯ
night	pe	*pəkko
sun	do	*nɯʔ-

English	Pumé	Waorani
you (plural)	mɛnɛrɔ	mĩnitõ
bee	ẽmi	æamo
path	nõ	taa-dõ
house	hõ	õ-kõ
sky	ãde	õ-õdæ
to sleep	mõã	bõ
peccary	aboea	amo
hot	kʊa-kʊ-a	ãgõã

== Phonology ==
Yaruro has one of the largest phonologies in the region, with 19 consonants and 15 vowels making for a total of 34 phonemes.

=== Consonants ===
		Labial	Dental	Postalveolar	Palatal	Velar	Glottal
Plosive	voiceless	p	t			k	ʔ
Plosive	aspirated	pʰ	tʰ			kʰ	
Plosive	voiced	b	d			ɡ	
Affricate	voiceless				c͡ç		
Affricate	aspirated			tʃʰ			
Affricate	voiced				ɟ͡ʝ		
Fricative		β					h
Nasal		m	n		ɲ	ŋ	
Tap			ɾ				

=== Vowels ===
		Front	Central	Back	
		Front	Central	unrounded	rounded
High	oral	i		ɯ	u
High	nasal	ĩ		ɯ̃	ũ
Close-mid		e		ɤ	o
Open-mid	oral	ɛ			ɔ
Open-mid	nasal	ɛ̃			ɔ̃
Low	oral		a		
Low	nasal		ã		

== Orthography ==
The Pumé alphabet was devised in 1982.
