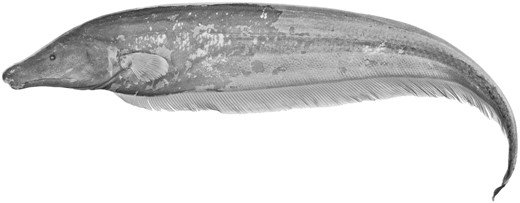
- A 132mm long specimen from the Pirre River in Panama

Conservation status
- Least Concern (IUCN 3.1)

Scientific classification
- Kingdom: Animalia
- Phylum: Chordata
- Class: Actinopterygii
- Order: Gymnotiformes
- Family: Apteronotidae
- Genus: Apteronotus
- Species: A. rostratus

Binomial name
- Apteronotus rostratus (Meek & Hildebrand, 1913)

Synonyms
- Stenarchus rostratus Meek & Hildebrand, 1913

= Apteronotus rostratus =

Species of fish

Apteronotus rostratus, known as macana in Spanish and veringo in Emberá, is a ghost knifefish from the family Apteronotidae. The species' name means "having a beak" in Latin, which refers to the elongated snouts most pronounced in the male individuals of the species.

== Description ==
The size of the species ranges widely from 74 to 182 mm. Like their fellow apteronotids, they possess a laterally compressed body, but they differ from some of their relatives in skull morphology. Apteronotids, along with other taxa of South American knifefishes, typically exhibit a wide diversity of skull shapes, ranging from highly elongate skulls to highly foreshortened ones, with both types evolving independently multiple times. A. rostratus is one of the species with elongate skulls that are tipped by the long and pointed snout which is their namesake. Their eyes are small and completely covered by thin membranes, reflecting their nocturnal lifestyle as they rely on active electroreception to navigate the dark waters instead. They have a terminal mouth located at the tip of their snout, a pair of elongate pectoral fins, a long and unbranched anal fin that originates from the operculum and extends throughout the stomach, a compressed and short tail that ends in a small and elongate caudal fin, and a sagittal electroreceptive filament located on the posterior half of their back.

After being soaked in alcohol for preservation, their body and head turn to grey or dark brown. The color of the dorsal stripe turns lighter. Their pectoral and anal fins turn to dark brown, and the fins' inter-radial membrane become translucent. Their caudal fin turns pale at the base encircled by lightly colored bands, grey or dark brown in the central portion, and translucent in the posterior portion.

== Systematics ==
Convergent evolution is extremely prevalent among different taxa of knifefishes, which has led systematists to reevaluate the old evolutionary relationships established based on morphology. The genus Apteronotus is one such example: it is polyphyletic and molecular analysis shows that A. rostratus is actually more closely related to several other genera of ghost knifefish than most of its congeners.

A. rostratus is most closely related to A. anu, and this group is sister to the rest of the tribe Navajini, which is one of the two tribes (alongside Apronotini) proposed by the phylogenetic study conducted by Maxwell J. Bernt and colleagues in 2019 that make up the subfamily Apteronotinae which belongs to the family Apteronotidae. A. rostratus, A. anu, A. apurensis, and A. bonapartii (which is non-monophylic) are the only members of the genus that belong to Navajini, and the rest of Apteronotus are nested within Apronotini except for A. cuchillejo, which is revealed by the study as the most basal taxon of Apteronotinae.

In terms of diagnostic features, A. rostratus can be distinguished from its congeners by having 14 to 16 caudal fin rays, an absent fifth infraorbital canal, a cartilaginous lateral ethmoid, 63 to 67 scales along the lateral line, 9 to 10 scales above the lateral line at the midbody, 153 to 162 anal fin rays, and a tail length 10.6 to 12.4% of the length to the end of the anal fin.

== Distribution ==
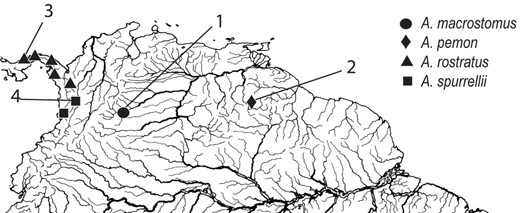
The distribution of A. rostratus along with several of its congeners

The family Apteronotidae is endemic to the Neotropics, and A. rostratus is found in the northern reaches of the family's range. They inhabit the rivers of Panama and the Magdalena and Cauca Rivers in northern Colombia. They live in patchy habitats in swift streams filled with rocks and root mats where they can hide in the crevices, roots, and leaf litter. Their abundance is the greatest during the Panamanian and Colombian rainy season from May to December, where they can be observed living in the riverbanks.

There exists morphological variation of the dorsal sagittal electroreceptive filament among the different A. rostratus populations. The northernmost populations in Panama have the shortest filament while the southernmost populations in Colombia have the longest, and a continuum is formed throughout the species' range where the populations in the middle have filament lengths somewhere between the extremes. The isolated nature of the populations given the geography of the river basins is thought to be responsible for this phenomenon.

== Life history ==
Apteronotus rostratus are cryptic and nocturnal. They tend to hide during the day to avoid predators and become active at night when they begin foraging. They, like many other electric knifefishes, make extensive use of electric organ discharge (EOD) signals where they generate an electric field as a spatial map to navigate and monitor their surroundings, which plays a crucial role in foraging, orienting themselves, and communicating with conspecifics. The males produce EOD at an average frequency of 626.0837 Hz while females have an average frequency of 636.22, which is indicative of a diet consisting primarily of aquatic invertebrates.

They are gregarious and exhibit a clumped distribution where individuals are closely aggregated together in their habitats, and such clumps are maintained via communication through EOD. Breeding and egg laying also occur in the clumps during the rainy season.

The lifespan and developmental history of A. rostratus remains unknown, but age determination methods such as scale circuli counts and otolith ring counts have been applied to its congener A. leptorhynchus.

In Apteronotus rostratus and some others, such as Compsaraia samueli, mature males grow extremely elongated snouts and oral jaws which are used in antagonistic interactions with other males. This is an example of sexual weaponry. A study comparing skull shape and jaw-closing performance in males and females of Apteronotus rostratus suggested that males with elongated faces for use in fights did not have lower mechanical advantages, in contrast to the similar species Compsaraia samueli in which males exhibit a trade-off between sexual weaponry and jaw leverage.

One specimen of A. rostratus collected from the Tuira River in Panama exhibits scoliosis and kyphosis, which is the first known account of a gymnotiform fish with such spinal deformities. This, however, did not seem to be significantly deleterious to the fish's fitness as the deformed specimen was still successful at foraging and reproduction. This is possibly a result of the unique method of propulsion utilized by the species where it is driven by the undulating anal fin, rendering the spinal deformities, which are marked by an arched upper back, less detrimental to the specimen's locomotion.

== Conservation status ==
The conservation status of A. rostratus is evaluated as "Least Concern", and the IUCN claims that the species' population is not undergoing notable decline. However, the species' habitats have been increasingly threatened by human activities in the Neotropics. For instance, The rainforests along the Piriatí River, which is one of the rivers in Panama that A. rostratus inhabit, had been thoroughly cleared and converted into pastures and farmlands in the past 30 years. Agricultural runoff also pollutes bodies of water, and similar cases of habitat loss and degradation have been occurring throughout eastern Panama.

== Cultural and economic value ==
Apteronotus rostratus are important fishery products to the Emberá, an indigenous people of Panama and Colombia that live in riverine communities. The people participate in fishing activities during the rainy season where A. rostratus peaks in abundance and the rivers rise to the level that allows boats to float. In addition to the ongoing forced displacement of indigenous communities driven by agricultural developments, the Emberá people's livelihood can be further endangered if A. rostratus populations were to experience decline.
