= Caramanta language =

Language

Caramanta
- Native to: Colombia
- Region: Antioquia Department
- Ethnicity: Caramanta
- Era: attested c. 1940s
- Language family: Chocoan: (unclassified); Anserma; Caramanta

Language codes
- ISO 639-3: crf
- Glottolog: cara1271

Caramanta is an extinct Chocoan language of Colombia, documented solely through a wordlist from the 1940s, and in an ethnographic publication from 1954. It is sometimes described as a dialect of Anserma.

== Vocabulary ==
=== Numerals ===
The following table compares Caramanta words with other Chocoan languages.

Numeral	Caramanta	Northern Emberá	Catío Embera	Wounaan	Anserma (Umbra)
1	aba	'aɓa	ába	ãb	omb̃e
2	ome	u'me	umé	numí	umbẽã
3	umpea	ũ'bea	ũbéa	tʰãřhũp	kimãri
4	quimane	kĩ'mãrĩ	kʰimárẽ	hayap	ís̄kal
5	juasoma	hueso'ma	wesomá ~ huwua 'one hand'	hua-ʔãb	sõ
