= Murder of Yuliana Samboní =

2016 child homicide in Colombia

Yuliana Samboní

Background information
- Born: Yuliana Andrea Samboní Muñoz; June 26, 2009; Cauca, Colombia
- Died: December 4, 2016 (aged 7) Bogotá, Colombia

The femicide of Yuliana Samboní was a case involving the kidnapping, rape, torture, and murder of a 7-year-old Indigenous Colombian girl that took place on December 4, 2016, in Bogotá, Colombia. The crime, committed by architect Rafael Uribe Noguera, sparked widespread outrage and deep public grief in Colombia and received international attention. The case was notable for the speed of the judicial proceedings, which was attributed in part to extensive media coverage and the strong public condemnation prompted by the extreme brutality of the crime.

== Background ==
=== Yuliana Samboní ===
Yuliana Andrea Samboní Muñoz (June 26, 2009 – December 4, 2016) was a member of a family composed of Nelly Esperanza Muñoz Ruano and Jubencio Sambony Sacanamboy from the Indigenous Emberá-Chamí community of Cauca. The family migrated to Bogotá in search of better opportunities due to rural poverty, low income from agricultural work, and violence caused by armed groups such as the FARC. Upon arriving in the capital, several relatives settled in the Bosque Calderón neighborhood, a modest area in the Chapinero locality inhabited by a community of Cauca origin that mainly worked in construction and domestic service.

=== Rafael Uribe Noguera ===
Rafael Manuel Uribe Noguera (born June 13, 1978) is the son of María Isabel Noguera and Rafael Noguera. A graduate in architecture from the Pontificia Universidad Javeriana, he belonged to an upper-class family with properties in northern Bogotá. He had acquired the Equus 66 building, a property developed by his family.

== Events ==
On December 4, 2016, at approximately 9:00 a.m., Rafael Manuel Uribe Noguera left the Equus 64 residential building, located at Carrera 64A No. 1A-85 in Bogotá, driving a gray Nissan X-Trail SUV with license plate DBO 960. He headed to the Bosque Calderón Tejada neighborhood in the northeast of the city.

Location of the Equus 66 building

Around 9:12 a.m., he parked in front of a property at Transversal 4 East No. 59-69, where seven-year-old Yuliana was playing in the street with two younger cousins. According to witnesses, Uribe Noguera stopped the vehicle, lured the girl under a pretext, seized her by force, and fled the scene. Near 9:30 a.m., the SUV returned to the Equus 64 building with the girl in the back seat. Uribe Noguera stayed for only a few minutes before leaving the building.

Ten minutes later, he entered the Equus 66 building, parked in the basement, and took the minor to apartment 603, an unoccupied unit owned by his family. Around 11:00 a.m., he received a delivery service at apartment 603 that provided cigarettes, a lighter, and a bottle of cooking oil. Forty minutes later, he left Equus 66, briefly went to his residence in Equus 64, and returned to apartment 603 wearing different clothes and carrying a backpack. In the early afternoon hours, Uribe Noguera left the Equus 66 building in the company of two of his brothers. Meanwhile, starting in the early afternoon, the National Police launched an investigation following the kidnapping report.

Thanks to the CCTV in the area and at the Equus 64 building, the vehicle and its owner were quickly identified. At approximately 8:45 p.m., authorities located the SUV and proceeded to apartment 603 of Equus 66. At 9:25 p.m. on December 4, 2016, judicial police found Yuliana's lifeless body hidden under the jacuzzi in apartment 603. The girl was naked, her body covered in cooking oil, with a red garment tied around her waist in a bow. According to the necropsy report from the National Institute of Legal Medicine, the cause of death was combined asphyxia due to suffocation and strangulation, with signs of sexual activity.

== Investigation and trial ==
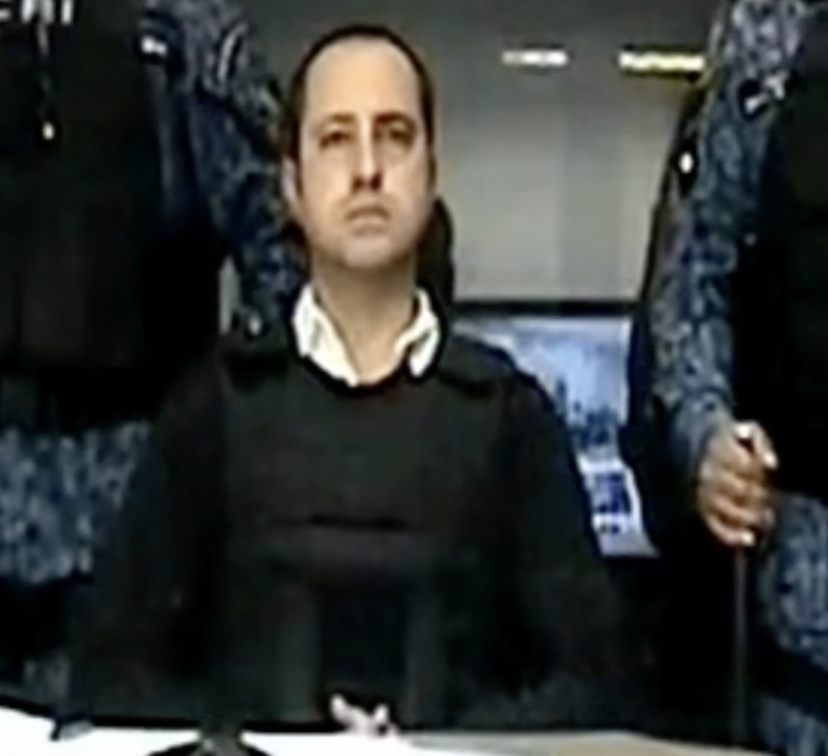
Noguera during a virtual arraignment hearing, 2017.

During the trial of his siblings Catalina and Francisco Uribe Noguera for alleged cover-up of the kidnapping and murder of Yuliana Samboní, Rafael Uribe Noguera gave testimony from the maximum-security prison in Valledupar. In his statement, he claimed that after committing the crime, he considered suicide by jumping from the balcony of his apartment in the Equus 66 building in Bogotá. According to his account, after learning that his siblings were trying to enter the property, he hid the girl's body and later informed them of her death and its location.

Initially, Uribe Noguera denied the charges and offered contradictory versions. In January 2017, he pleaded guilty. On March 29, 2017, he was sentenced to 51 years and 10 months in prison after being found responsible as the perpetrator of aggravated femicide, aggravated violent carnal access, and aggravated simple kidnapping. Following a successful appeal by the Office of the Attorney General of Colombia, the Superior Court of Bogotá modified the sentence and increased it to 58 years in prison.

The court also raised the fine from 100 to 1,223 current legal monthly minimum wages. The decision was based on the first-instance ruling not having correctly applied certain aggravating factors related to the crimes of aggravated violent carnal access and aggravated simple kidnapping committed against a minor.

The court determined that the attributed conduct should be sanctioned more severely and noted that the initial sentence had not properly calculated the penalties for the imputed offenses.

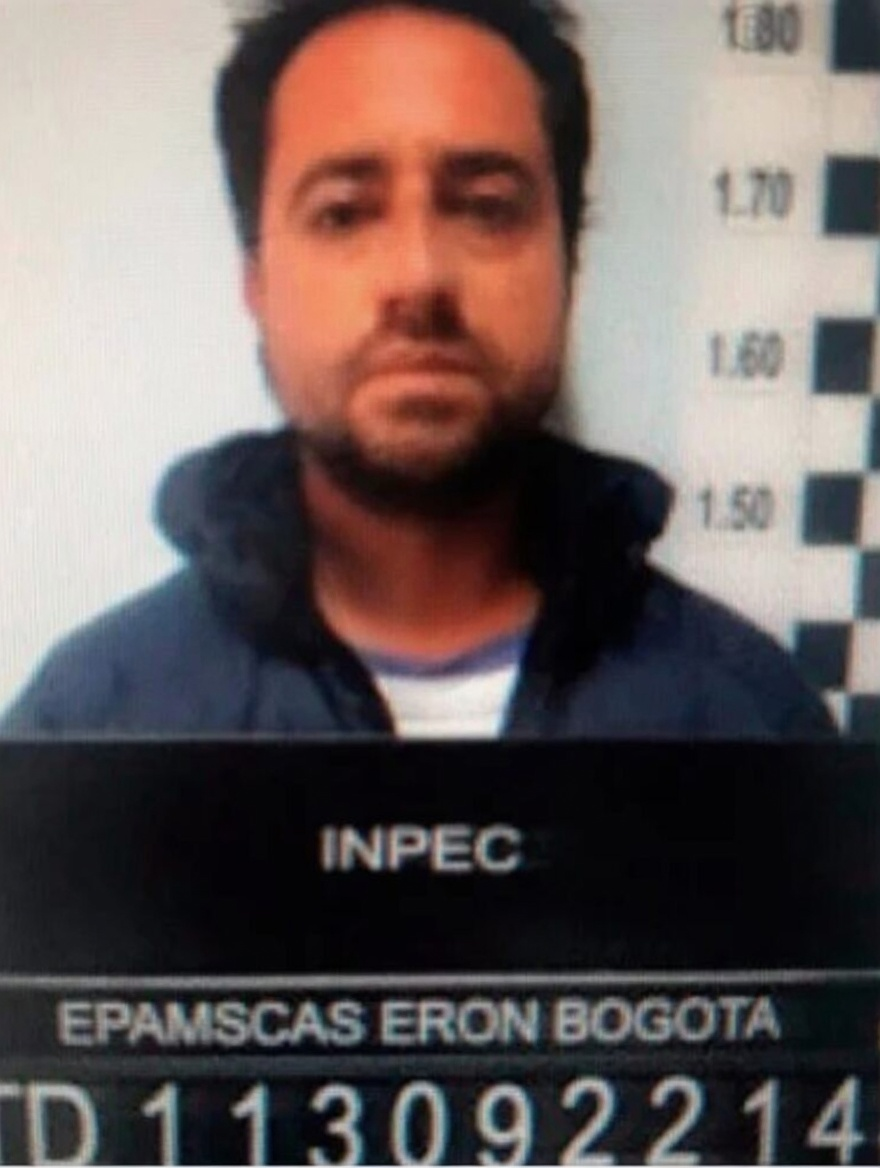
Mugshot of Noguera

His siblings Francisco and Catalina Uribe Noguera were investigated for alleged cover-up and concealment of evidence but were ultimately declared innocent.

During the investigation, controversial facts also emerged, such as the death of the building's security guard, considered a relevant witness, who died by suicide a few days after the murder.

Rafael Uribe Noguera received one of the longest sentences in Colombia. During his imprisonment, he obtained sentence reductions for work and study, a legal mechanism that allows time to be deducted from effective prison time as part of the resocialization process without modifying the imposed sentence.

By 2020, he had accumulated six months and twelve days of reductions. Associates of the femicide perpetrator reportedly agreed not to make public statements about him. In the investigation, the Office of the Attorney General of Colombia examined his computer for evidence of possible additional crimes, including child pornography and potential links to networks of sexual exploitation of minors, these hypotheses did not result in additional convictions.

== Repercussions and family situation ==
The femicide of Yuliana Samboní became a symbol of violence against girls and women in Colombia, as well as of social inequalities, classism, and racism. It sparked massive demonstrations, statements from organizations such as UN Women and UNICEF, and public condemnations from then-President Juan Manuel Santos.

The case had repercussions on the public image of institutions indirectly linked to Rafael Uribe Noguera, such as the Pontificia Universidad Javeriana, where he obtained his architecture degree, and the law firm Brigard & Urrutia, where his brother was a partner. The university stated that it could not be held responsible for the individual actions of its graduates, while the firm acknowledged that the case had a reputational impact due to its indirect connection to the media scandal.

After Yuliana Samboní's murder in 2016, her family faced not only grief but also social inequality and lack of support. Her relatives denounced that their poverty may have led the perpetrator to believe they would not demand justice. The neighborhood where they lived reflected the situation of many displaced people: unpaved streets, lack of basic services, and proximity to wealthy areas such as Chapinero Alto and Rosales.

The family eventually returned to Cauca after the murder due to the trauma and fear caused by the crime. Currently, her father, Juvencio Samboní, works in occasional jobs along with her mother.Initially, the family expressed rejection of economic compensation, considering that it could be interpreted as a monetary valuation of their daughter's life, in accordance with their Indigenous beliefs. However, the fine imposed on Rafael Uribe Noguera was payable to the State and not to the family. Any eventual economic reparations would have had to be requested through other legal mechanisms, which were not pursued due to lack of resources and legal advice.

Nevertheless, the Colombian internet community organized a donation drive through the Vaki crowdfunding platform to provide economic support to the family, raising 68,273,794 Colombian pesos (approximately US$20,500) to date. Ten years after the crime, Yuliana Samboní's father stated that he still has doubts about whether Rafael Uribe Noguera acted alone in the murder of his daughter. He noted that it is difficult for him to understand how the perpetrator could have carried out the kidnapping and transport while driving, leading him to wonder if someone else could have helped, although he acknowledged that he has no evidence and that only God knows what happened. He recalled that Yuliana would have been close to graduating and dreamed of becoming a nurse.

Despite the difficulties, the Samboní family maintained strong family and community ties. The tragedy generated solidarity among the Cauca community in the neighborhood and in society at large, although the family feared that over time their case and the conditions of displaced people would be forgotten.
