= Emberá Baudó =

Chocoan language spoken in Colombia

Baudó
- Catrú
- Êbêrâ 'Βe'dea
- Native to: Colombia
- Region: Chocó Department, Baudó river basin and Pacific coastal rivers between Cabo Corrientes north towards Northern Embera language area.
- Native speakers: (5,000 cited 1995)
- Language family: Chocoan: Emberá; Southern Emberá; Baudó

Language codes
- ISO 639-3: bdc
- Glottolog: embe1259
- Linguasphere: 81-EIA-ah
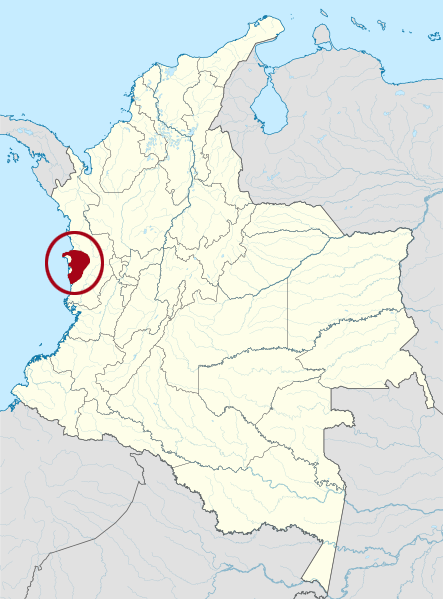

Baudó Emberá also known as Baudó is an Embera language of Colombia. It is partially intelligible with both Northern Embera and Eperara, and it is not clear which branch of Embera it belongs to.
