= Anserma =

Anserma may refer to:

- Anserma, Caldas, a town and municipality in Colombia
- Anserma language, an extinct Chocoan language of Colombia
