= Barred B =

Letter of the Latin alphabet

Crossed out B
- B̵ b̵

Usage
- Writing system: Latin script
- Language of origin: Kiowa; Northern Embera; Pilagá

History
- Development: B b: B̵ b̵

Other
- Writing direction: Left-to-Right

Crossed out B (majuscule: B̵, minuscule: b̵) is letter of the Latin alphabet formed by addition of the bar through the letter B. It is used in Kiowa, Northern Embera and Pilagá languages.

== Usage ==
The orthography of Northern Embera language used in Panama, the letter represents the voiced bilabial implosive ([ɓ]) sound. In contrast, the orthography of the language used in Colombia, replaces the letter with Ɓ. It is also used in Pilagá language.

The lower case letter was also used as a phonetic symbol, for example by William A. Smalley in his 1968 Manual of articulatory phonetics. In his work Smalley used the letter as a representation of the voiced bilabial fricative ([β]) sound.

== Bibliography ==
- Geoffrey K. Pullum, William A. Ladusaw, Phonetic Symbol Guide, Chicago, London, The University of Chicago Press, 1996, 2nd edition.
- William A. Smalley, Manual of articulatory phonetics, Tarrytown, Practical Anthropology, 1968
- Dadyi Beđeada Ƀʌđia, Guía para docentes, República de Panamá, Ministerio de Educación - Dirección General de Educación, Unidad de Coordinación Técnica para la Ejecución de Programas Especiales en las Áreas Indígenas, Segundo Proyecto de Educación Básica / Banco Mundial, 2006
