= Cueva people =

Indigenous people of Panama

Cueva was the name assigned by Spanish colonists to the language spoken in the various Indigenous polities they encountered in Eastern Panama. Although it has been used historically by scholars to describe a specific ethnicity, many scholars now believe that the peoples who used the Cueva language belonged to multiple ethnolinguistic groups, and that this language was in fact a lingua franca.

== See also ==
- Cueva language
- Guna people
