= Arma–Pozo language =

Extinct language of Colombia

Arma
- Arma-Pozo
- Native to: Colombia
- Ethnicity: Arma
- Extinct: (date missing)
- Language family: Chocoan ?: Arma

Language codes
- ISO 639-3: aoh (deprecated in 2020 for being spurious)
- Glottolog: arma1244

Arma (Arma-Pozo) is a poorly attested and extinct language of Colombia. Loukotka (1968) states that it was once spoken on the Pueblano River. Only one word of Arma-Pozo is known, being ume 'woman'.
