= Puana =

Puana is a snake god in the Mythology of the Yaruro people from Venezuela. He, along with Itcai the Jaguar, is responsible for creating the earth and water. He is also credited with teaching Kuma, the mother goddess, the correct way of becoming pregnant.
