= Pumé people =

Indigenous people, native to Venezuela

Pumé Yaruro
Pumé
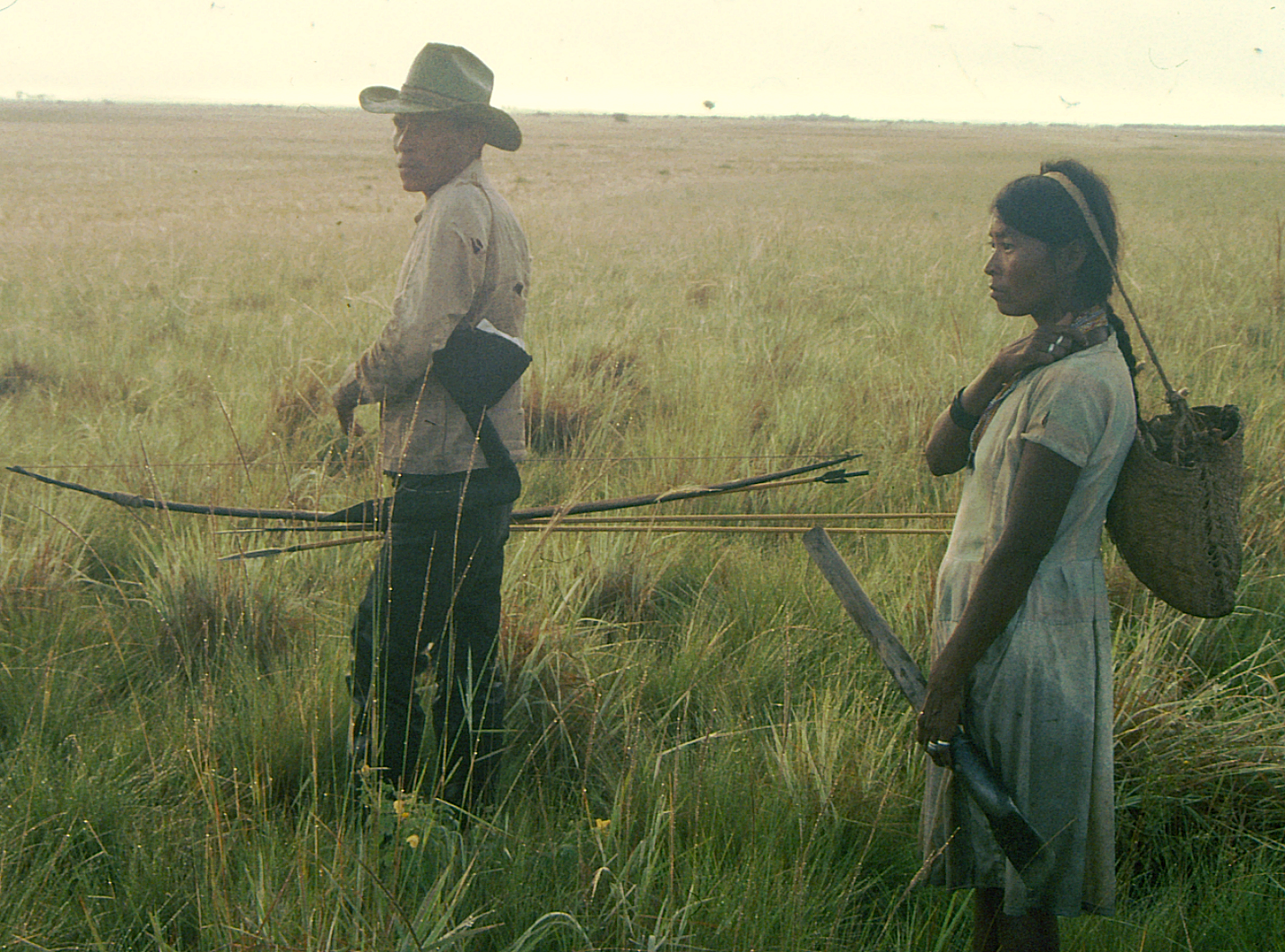
- Savanna Pumé man & woman in the Venezuelan llanos on a hunting and gathering trip

Total population
- 7,269 (2001)

Regions with significant populations
- Venezuela

Languages
- Pumé, Spanish

Religion
- traditional tribal religion

The Pumé people (or Yaruro) are a Circum-Caribbean indigenous people, native to the ecoregion of Llanos in Venezuela, located west of the Orinoco River. The Pumé people are divided into two subgroups: The River Pumé, living along major river drainages of the Orinoco River, and the more nomadic Savanna Pumé that reside on the Llanos.

== Name ==
The word "Yaruro" was employed by early Spanish explorers and colonists to refer to the Pumé and is still commonly used in Venezuela. The term has been used by neighboring indigenous groups such as the Guahibo, Hiwi, and Chiricoa, who likely are the source of this name adopted by the Spanish. "Yaruro" probably derives from the verb "yoro" in the Pumé language, that means "to give". The term "Yaruro" is pejorative, referring to requests for material goods or food from outsiders perceived as wealthy by the Pumé, and its meaning can be glossed in American English as the "Gimmees". The people refer to themselves as the Pumé (meaning "real human") which also serves as the name of their language. "Yaruro" has been replaced by "Pumé" in most anthropological literature and by some Venezuelan government use that is sensitive to indigenous issues. They have historically also been known by other names such as Llaruro, Yaruru, and Yuapín people.

== Culture ==
=== Language ===
The Pumé language is unclassified, although it is considered a language isolate. Some good linguistic research has been published on the Pumé language. It is widely spoken by the Pumé people today, especially among Savanna Pumé who are primarily monolingual. Most River Pumé populations have at least some members, primarily men, who are bilingual in Spanish and Pumé. Portions of the Bible were translated into Pumé in 1999.

=== Housing ===
The Savanna Pumé are a mobile group of hunter-gatherers who shift their primary residence during every dry and wet season. They live in small brush shade structures during the dry season, and more robust structures thatched with palm leaves during the wet seasons. In addition to these two major seasonal moves, the Pumé make temporary camps for fishing, raw material collection, and to stage the moves to their primary wet and dry season camps. River Pumé were formerly slightly nomadic (although not as much as the Savanna Pumé), but currently are sedentary. Many River Pumé now construct more hybrid forms of architecture combining traditional and Criollo-influenced materials and designs.

=== Subsistence ===
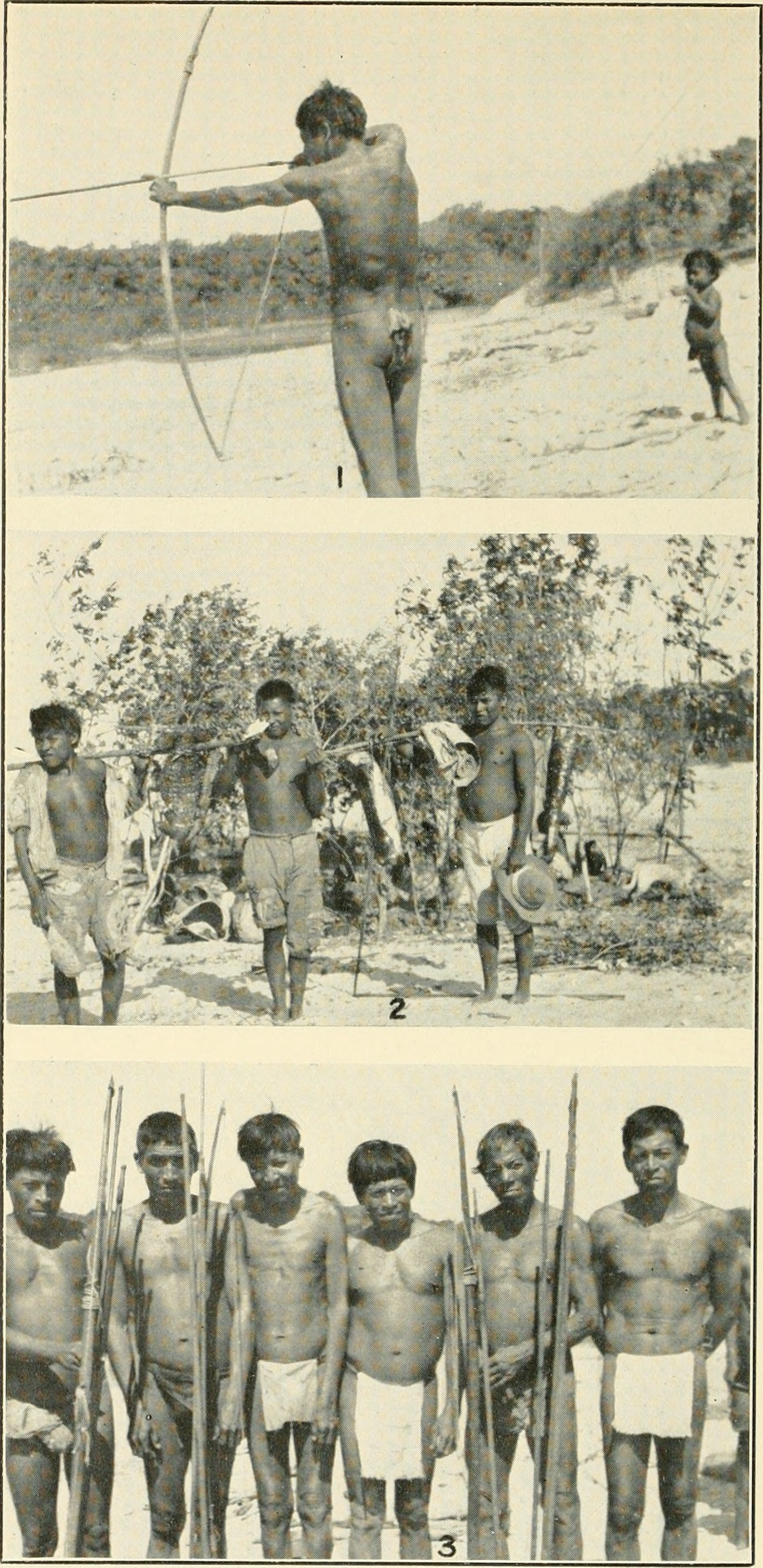
River Pumé men, dry season camp (Plate 12 from Petrullo, 1939)

The Savanna Pumé are primarily hunter-gatherers who subsist on distinctly different diets during each of the dry and wet seasons. The River Pumé are horticulturalists who also practice some fishing, hunting and wild plant collection. Savanna Pumé men hunt primarily small terrestrial game during the wet season such as armadillos, tegu lizards, other small lizards, and rabbits. Men very infrequently obtain larger game such as capybara, deer, anteaters, or caimans. All hunting by Savanna Pumé is done with bows and arrows. Women collect several wild tubers, that are the main food during the wet season. Both sexes also perform some garden work that brings in complementary manioc as a dietary supplement without reducing their foraging for wild plants. Gardening is typical of swidden systems used by many tropical peoples throughout the world, however Savanna Pumé gardens are quite small compared with those of the River Pumé or other South American groups. In the past, foraging for turtle eggs was reported but is very uncommon today, possibly because of over-exploitation during the last 200 years. Other past game animals such as hunting for manatees are recognized as potentially edible, but no recent reports of their consumption are reported by the Pumé. During the dry season, Pumé men fish using bows and arrows, hook and line, and fish poison. The dry season also offers opportunities for bird hunting and capture of small numbers of turtles and tortoises. Women, accompanied by some men, collect feral mangos in prodigious quantities during the dry season as well as a few other species of small fruits that are much less important. River Pumé have less seasonal variation in their diet. They rely more on a diversity of cultivated crops, can fish year round in the major rivers, hunt and gather some foods, and may work in wage labor jobs for the local Criollos. River Pumé successfully raise small numbers of chickens and pigs, animals rarely husbanded by Savanna Pumé for more than a couple months before being consumed during periods of hunger

=== Material culture ===
The Savanna Pumé population manufactures most of their material technology, except some market items obtained through trade, primarily with River Pumé who have greater access to these market goods. Items such as cooking pots, steel knives, machetes, shovels, and used clothing are the primary outside goods obtained by the Savanna Pumé through trade. Other desired market items include matches, tobacco, nylon hammocks, whetstones, and other tools. Bicycles first became common in 2006. Given the economic difficulties in Venezuela, it is unclear whether the Savanna Pumé even have the minimal access seen in the early 2000s to some of these goods. Some River Pumé communities are the beneficiaries of government programs that include some provisioning with manufactured products.

Savanna Pumé construct their houses primarily from materials collected in the llanos; wood, palm leaf thatch, and vines used to tie together the house framework. Moriche palms (Mauritia flexuosa) are the critical resource needed for palm thatch, roofing material, as well as other significant technologies. Their distribution is an important factor in the amount of land needed by Savanna Pumé to schedule future moves from areas with depressed availability of moriche and other palm raw materials. Some zinc lamina has been available for roofing, and is extensively re-used during camp moves. Architectural wood and thatch is often moved along with camps to re-build new structures. Traditional architecture is still common in Savanna Pumé communities, although modern construction materials increasingly dominate River Pumé house construction.

Fibers made from moriche palm leaves as well as whole leaves, are some of the most important raw materials used by the Savanna Pumé. The River Pumé primarily use fibers from macanilla palms (Astrocaryum jauri). Palm leaf fibers are used to make string, rope, hammocks, basket containers, basketry mats, and many diverse woven containers and objects for subsistence, storage, and other critical technologies. Collection of this raw material is most common in the dry season when women process and accumulate the fine fibers from palm leaves needed for string/rope construction and weaving. Palm raw materials and products remain important trade items within Pumé culture, both among Savanna and River Pumé.

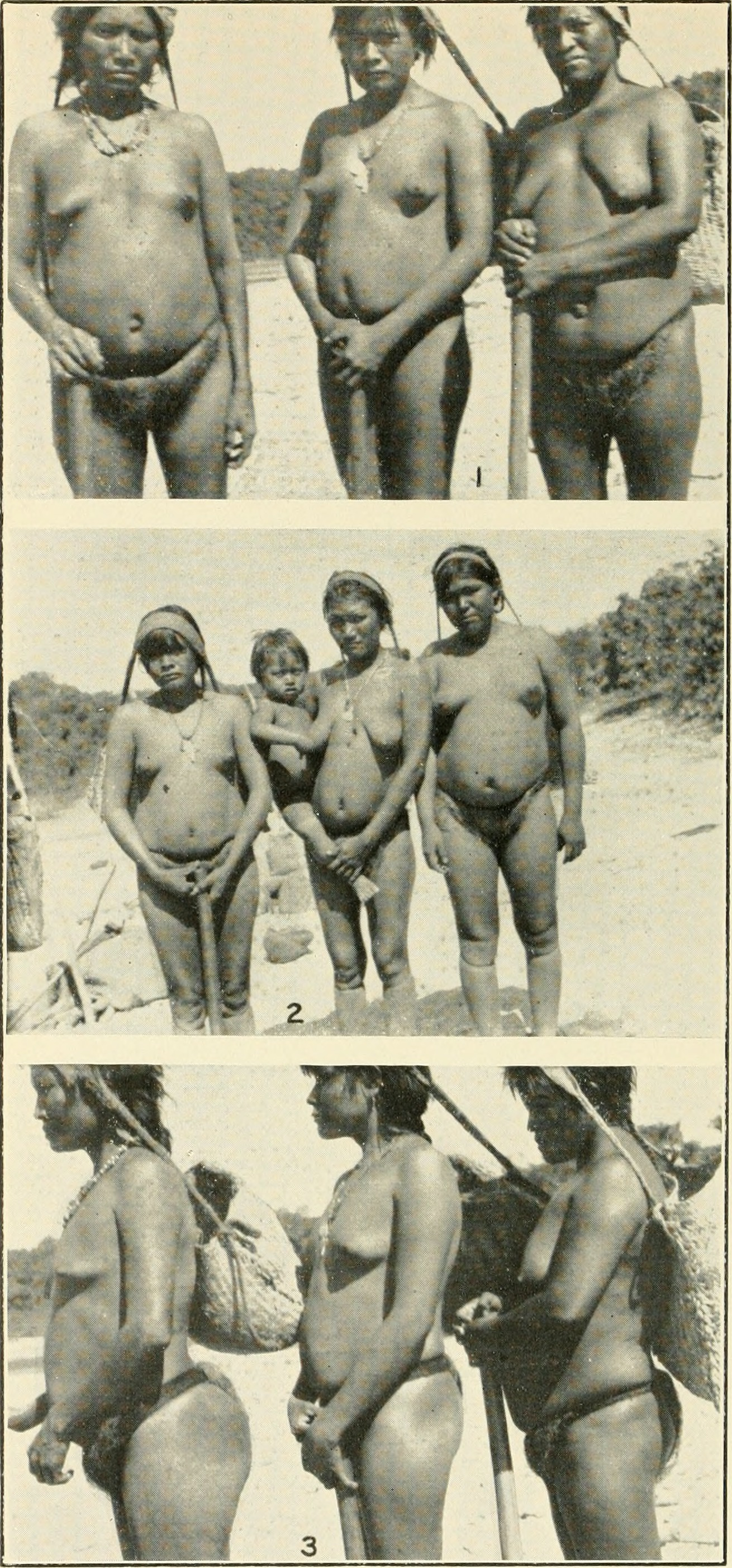
River Pumé women, dry season camp (Plate 18 from Petrullo, 1939)

Women's subsistence technology includes carrying baskets made from whole palm leaves with tumplines for carrying, wooden digging sticks, and digging sticks with steel tips. Women may include synthetic feed sacks for carrying plant foods (especially for the collection of feral mangos and manioc), or cloth sacks or clothing as additional carrying additional resources. Most gathering of root foods involves only the use of traditional palm leaf baskets. Wet season collection of wild tubers uses untipped wooden digging sticks, because the primary tubers (Dracontium margaretae) are close to the ground surface. Steel tipped digging sticks are primarily used for collection of deeper-growing tubers (mostly Myrossma cannifolia), late in the wet season and during parts of the dry season. Women use these same technologies in gardening. Both men and women also use small shovels and machetes for garden work and harvesting.

Men's subsistence technology, at least for Savanna Pumé, uses bows and arrows for terrestrial hunting and much fishing, modern fishing line and hooks (if available through trade), specialized harpoons or arrows for caimans or turtles, as well as knives and machetes. Bows are made from palm wood (Astrocaryum jauri.) and are long (~2 m) as are most South American native bows. Bowstrings are made from a semi-cultivated bromiliad fiber (Ananas lucidus). Arrows, (also ~2m long) are made from domesticated arrowcanes, wooden foreshafts, fletched with anhinga feathers, and constructed with bromiliad fiber and a manufactured tree resin (Symphonia glubulifera). Scavenged, traded, and re-used pieces of metal are used for arrowpoints, probably at least since the mid 19th century. Bone is reported to have been used before metal was as common, and two wooden-tipped bird arrows are still occasionally employed. Some River Pumé men have access to guns for hunting. Because most hunted foods in the savannas are burrowing game (armadillos, tegu lizards, and small ameiva lizards), machetes and especially bows often are used as digging implements to capture these game. During the dry season, small rafts made from moriche plalm leaf stems are used to search for caimans and turtles in seasonal lagoons. River Pumé use dugout canoes for fishing, pursuit of caimans, and turtles in the major drainages of the llanos, as well as for transportation.

The Pumé manufacture a wide array of other traditional implements from string, woven materials, and wood. Manufactured clothing and cloth has been readily available to the Pumé since at least the 19th century, and probably much earlier. Although western style dress is common among all Savanna and especially River Pumé, among savanna dwellers some traditional elements of women's clothing have persisted and some older men recently still eschewed pants in favor of loincloths.

=== Kinship and personal names ===
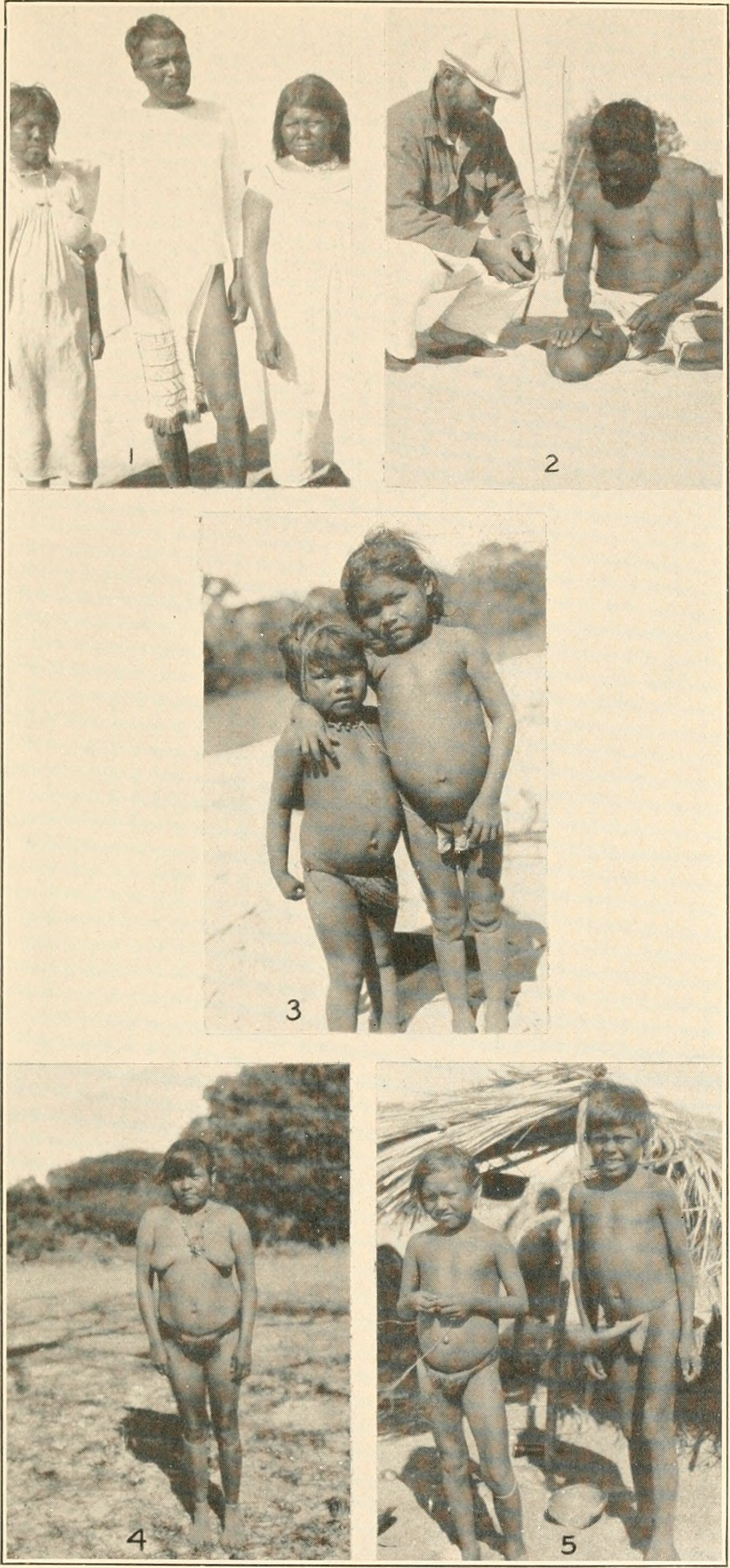
River Pumé in dry season camp (Plate 25 from Petrullo, 1939)

Traditionally, the Pumé do not use names, but employ kin terms to reference each other. Even nicknames are not used. All Pumé people have Christian names used to interact with the local Criollo population, or given to them by the Venezuelan government for census or other administrative purposes, but they do not use them among themselves. These names may rarely be used when referencing people from distant communities where kin terms do not precisely identify a person. Spanish names used by Savanna Pumé often change throughout childhood and some adults' names also vary during their lifespan. Spanish names are sometimes used when speaking to or about children below the age of approximately 14, primarily because kin terms may not specifically identify particular young people. The Pumé use a Dravidian form of Dakota-Iroquois kinship classification.

=== Marriage ===
By the age of 15, most Savanna and River Pumé girls are married. Boys also marry young, but the early marriage of Pumé girls is particularly important as a demographic indicator of relatively rapid maturation in response to living in an environment with low food availability, high disease exposure, and potentially high risks of mortality. Pumé girls work less than girls in comparable hunter-gatherer populations, allowing them to potentially spend more calories on growth rather than on foraging effort, and thus reach sexual maturity at a younger age. This may lengthen their reproductive lifespan, compensating for their shorter life expectancy and their high infant and later childhood mortality rates. Although early marriage is the general practice for Pumé hunter-gatherers, there is no evidence of coercion of girls to marry or begin sexual relations before they feel ready.

Marriage involves no formal ceremony, exchange of goods, or overt negotiations among adults. It simply consists of establishing co-habitation by the couple. There is some influence of parents on choice of marriage partners, but it is a very flexible system.

A small percentage of men have more than one wife, who are usually sisters (sororal polygyny). Among both Savanna and River Pumé, infidelity is uncommon and is cause for divorce. Compared with many lowland South American indigenous groups, the Pumé have low rates of infidelity and divorce among both men and women.

=== Religion and medicine ===
The Pumé engage in frequent all-night dances called tohé for religious and social purposes. These 11-hour dances are held 3-4 nights a week throughout the year. Among the Savanna Pumé, all members of the camp are present in the plaza area of camp for these dances. Smaller River Pumé communities also hold village wide-dances, but larger River communities often have separate dances attended by extended families that represent only a segment of the larger group. The tohé dance involves verse and response singing during the entire night, and increased frequency and speed of circulation around a central pole erected each dance night in the dance plaza. An area on the western side of the plaza is where non-dancing participants watch the tohé. A male dance leader performs the majority of the singing and leads the energetic dancing. Many men also sing primary verses and the chorus responses. Women are an important part of the dance, singing the choruses, joining in the dancing around the central pole, and perform specialized dance steps several times a night at most dances. Dance songs are partially formulaic but include significant amounts of improvisational singing. They are rhythmically and melodically complex compositions. Men accompany the dance with rattles, the only musical instrument used by the Pumé. Dances can involve healing events for particular individuals suffering from physical diseases and psychological distress (depression, grief, frustration). Dances can also lead to trance-states by the dance leader or other individuals. Trances involve possession by spirits or deceased Pumé individuals. The possessed individual speaks through those personages to the community as a whole or to particular individuals about events of current concern to the camp or person singled out for contact. No food is consumed during dances, but prodigious amounts of tobacco are smoked by men, women, and children. Men also take hallucinogenic snuff in group bouts during the dance (Anadenanthera peregrina) and sometimes chew a second hallucinogen (Banisteriopsis caapi). The Pumé consider the tohé dance to be one of the central institutions of their culture along with their indigenous language. The tohé dance has an important role in group solidarity and in reinforcing the cooperative structure of Pumé life (especially among Savanna Pumé) that appears to be a critical adaptation to life in this challenging and seasonally food-impoverished environment.

Some formerly reported ceremonials are apparently no longer practiced. The names of these ceremonials are familiar to Savanna Pumé but their forms are no longer known. A specialized women's ceremony that is still common among both Savanna and River Pumé is the añikuí tohé (little sister tohé). Among Savanna Pumé this is an all-night singing bout performed by older women. An individual woman performs this singing on her own from her hammock over the same time period as the community wide tohé dance, from approximately sunset until sunrise. River Pumé women normally conduct the añikuí tohé during the daytime and it often is of shorter duration than the Savanna Pumé version. Savanna Pumé women only do the little sister tohé during the evening and it always lasts the entire night. The añikuí tohé is much less frequently sung than the community-wide dances among the Savanna Pumé. Because the River Pumé version can be much shorter and is a daytime curing ceremony, it has more often been observed by ethnographers. The Savanna Pumé little sister tohé is always performed during an evening when the community tohé is held. Savanna Pumé women singing the añikuí tohé sing continuously for 11 hours with no break from the performance. They may smoke tobacco during the evening from their hammocks, but not as prodigiously as the leader of the community dances. No musical instrument is used by women during their singing of the rhythmically and melodically complex little sister tohé song cycles. The purpose of the añikuí tohé appears to be similar to the stated reasons for the community wide tohé, for curing, and for personal insight into current issues or problems affecting the community, the singer, or her family. The practice of the añikuí tohé demonstrates the importance of women in Pumé society and remains an important cultural element of the Savanna and River Pumé.

The Pumé have a number of effective plant-based medicines that are used in treating a range of illnesses and minor traumas. They make unguents that aid in the healing of cuts, other wounds, and skin irritations, and prepare other medicines for pain, snakebite, and other maladies. Other medicinal chants, touching, and the commonly observed "sucking-cure" may offer psychological help for minor ailments and normal fluctuations in mood. Community support for ill or distressed individuals likewise may be a rational and effective means of promoting health and psychological healing. All Pumé are aware of the efficacy of western medicines and desire greater access to them.

See also Puana, a goddess in Yaruro mythology.

== Outside pressures ==
The Pumé have had contact with Europeans since at least the 17th century. The greatest amount of contact has been among River Pumé communities because they are located on the primary transportation routes within the llanos. Early missionary work and subsequent development has resulted in dramatic changes among groups nearest to population centers of non-Pumé. The lack of significant economic development in much of this region has left most Pumé communities minimally affected by some of the rapid changes affecting traditional populations in other parts of Venezuela and throughout the world. This is especially true of Savanna Pumé who live away from the major tributaries of the Orinoco River. All Pumé have experienced changes in many areas of their life, especially during the 20th century. Increased occupation of some parts of the llanos occurred from the 1960s onwards. Opportunities for wage labor brought access to market goods, but also introduced alcohol, evangelical Christian missionary influences, and conflicts with some Criollos (but certainly not all) that were considered undesirable outcomes of greater contact with the larger Venezuelan culture and economy. In some highly acculturated Pumé communities, problems from the introduction of alcohol have resulted in few or no tohe performances and village participation in dance, an outcome considered socially destructive by community members who still value this vital aspect of Pumé culture. Most Pumé communities do not have clear land ownership rights to the areas that they occupy. Mandates under the Chavez administration prioritized land tenure as a goal for helping indigenous populations throughout Venezuela. This program has realized variable successes throughout the country, however only some Pumé communities have been given legal protection of some or all of their lands. The Pumé themselves express a desire for the protection of their lands from potential encroachment. They also emphasize the importance of preserving their traditional culture, language, and dance as well as access to some outside assistance such as medical attention, tools, and other market goods.
