= Anserma language =

Chocoan language of Colombia

Anserma
- Umbra
- Native to: Colombia
- Region: Antioquia Department
- Ethnicity: Umbrá
- Native speakers: c. 100 (2011)
- Language family: Chocoan: Anserma
- Dialects: Caramanta †; Cartama

Language codes
- ISO 639-3: ans
- Glottolog: anse1238

Anserma (Anserna, Umbra) is a Chocoan language of Colombia, spoken by the Umbrá people. Dialects included Caramanta and Cartama. The language was thought to be extinct until 7 families were found to speak it in 2011.

Jolkesky (2016) notes that there are lexical similarities with the Barbacoan languages due to contact.

== Vocabulary ==
Below are listed some of the known words of the Anserma language.

Gloss	Anserma
salt	anzer, anserm, ancer
Spanish	tamaraca
devil	xixarama
herb added to chicha to make it stronger	tabaque
market	tianguez
