= Emberá Catío =

Chocoan language spoken in Colombia and Panama

Catío
- Emberá-Catío
- Native to: Colombia, Panama
- Native speakers: (15,000 cited 1992)
- Language family: Chocoan: Emberá; Northern; Catío

Language codes
- ISO 639-3: cto
- Glottolog: embe1260
- ELP: Emberá-Catío
- Linguasphere: 81-EIA-ad
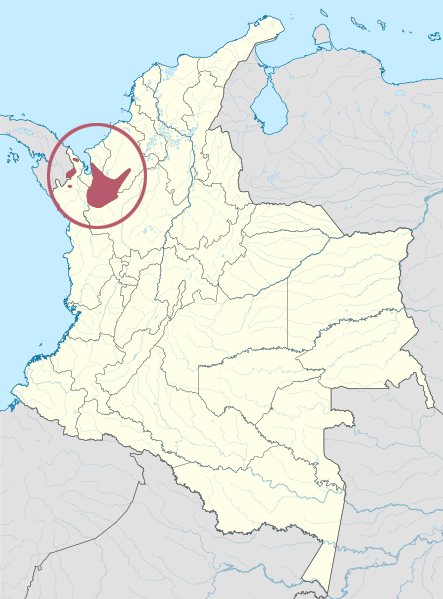

Catío Emberá (Catío, Katío) is an indigenous American language spoken by the Embera people of Colombia and Panama.

The language was spoken by 15,000 people in Colombia, and a few dozen in Panama, according to data published in 1992. 90 to 95% of the speakers are monolingual with a 1% literacy rate. The language is also known as Eyabida, and like most Embera languages goes by the name Embena 'human'.

== Phonology ==
=== Consonants ===
Consonants
| | | Bilabial | Alveolar | Palatal | Velar | Glottal |
|---|---|---|---|---|---|---|
| Plosive/ Affricate | aspirated | pʰ | tʰ | t͡ʃʰ | kʰ | |
| Plosive/ Affricate | ejective | pʼ | tʼ | t͡ʃʼ | kʼ | |
| Plosive/ Affricate | voiced | b | d | d͡ʒ | | |
| Fricative | aspirated | | sʰ | | | h |
| Fricative | ejective | | sʼ | | | |
| Nasal | | m | n | | | |
| Rhotic | trill | | r | | | |
| Rhotic | tap | | ɾ | | | |
| Semivowel | | w | | | | |

=== Vowels ===
Vowels
| | Front | Central | Back | |
| | Front | Central | unrounded | rounded |
|---|---|---|---|---|
| High | i ĩ | | ɯ ɯ̃ | u ũ |
| Mid | e ẽ | | o õ | |
| Low | | a ã | | |

== Writing system ==
Catio is written with the Latin script.

Vowels
| a | ã | e | ẽ | i | ĩ | o | õ | u | ũ | ʉ | ʉ̃ |

Consonants
| m | k | b | p | t | ch | s | z | g | j | r | rr | d | n | y | w | ñ |

== Notes ==
=== Bibliography ===
- Silva Vallejo, Fabio; Majore, Iván Antonio Dominico (2018). "Los emberá katio del Alto Sinú-Córdoba". Oraloteca (in Spanish). 9: 64–84. Archived from the original on 5 October 2022.
