= Chocoan languages =

Language family of Colombia and Panama

Chocoan
- Geographic distribution: Colombia and Panama
- Linguistic classification: One of the world's primary language families
- Subdivisions: Emberá; Waunana–Cueva †; Unclassified: • Anserma • Arma † • Caramanta †

Language codes
- Glottolog: choc1280
- Linguasphere: 81-EI
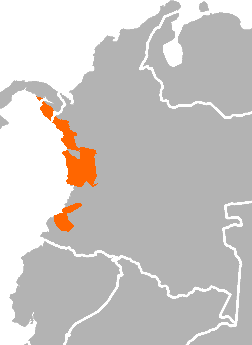

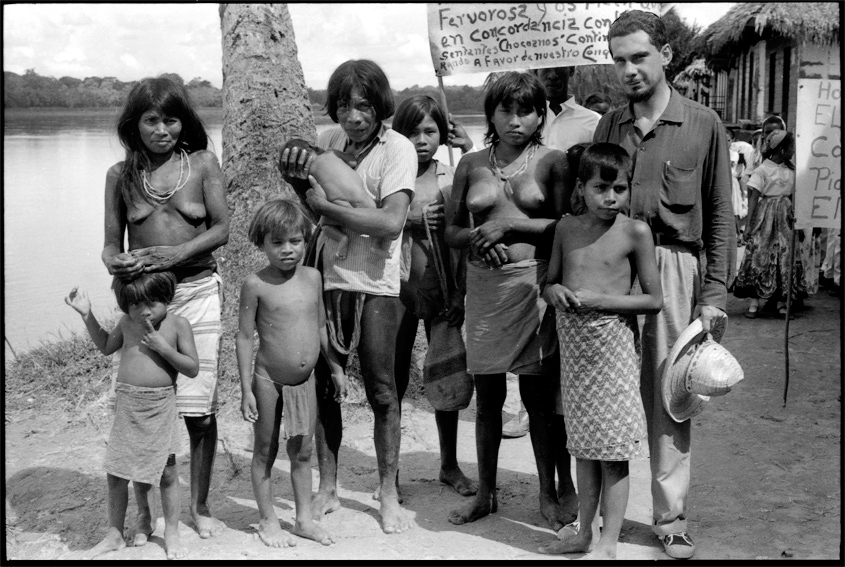
Poet and politician Eduardo Cote Lamus on his journey in Río San Juan (Choco, Colombia) in 1958 with some of the people speaking Choco languages

The Chocoan languages (also Choco, Chocó, Chokó) are a small family of Indigenous languages spread across Colombia and Panama.

== Family division ==
Chocoan consists of two known branches and at least four unclassified languages.

- The Emberá languages (Chocó proper, Cholo)
- Wounaan (Noanamá, Waunana, Woun Meu)–Cueva †
- ?Sinúfana (Cenufara) †
- Anserma
  - Caramanta †
- ? Arma †

At least Arma, Cueva and Caramanta are extinct.

The Emberá group consists of two languages mainly in Colombia with over 60,000 speakers that lie within a fairly mutually intelligible dialect continuum. Ethnologue divides this into six languages. Kaufman (1994) considers the term Cholo to be vague and condescending. Noanamá has some 6,000 speakers on the Panama-Colombia border.

=== Jolkesky (2016) ===
Internal classification by Jolkesky (2016):

- Choko
  - Waunana
  - Embera
    - Southern
      - Embera Baudo
      - Embera Chami
      - Epena
    - Northern
      - Embera Katio
      - Embera Darien

== Language contact ==
Jolkesky (2016) notes that there are lexical similarities with the Guahibo, Kamsa, Paez, Tukano, Witoto-Okaina, Yaruro, Chibchan, and Bora-Muinane language families due to contact.

Genetic links between Choco and Chibchan had been proposed by Lehmann (1920). However, similarities are few, some of which may be related to the adoption of maize cultivation from neighbors.

== Genetic relations ==
Choco has been included in a number of hypothetical phylum relationships:

- within Morris Swadesh's Macro-Leco
- Antonio Tovar, Jorge A. Suárez, and Robert Gunn: related to Cariban
- Čestmír Loukotka (1944): Southern Emberá may be related to Paezan, Noanamá to Arawakan
- within Paul Rivet and Loukotka's (1950) Cariban
- Constenla Umaña and Margery Peña: may be related to Chibchan
- within Joseph Greenberg's Nuclear Paezan, most closely related to Paezan and Barbacoan
- with Yaruro according to Pache (2016)

== Proto-language ==
For reconstructions of Proto-Chocó and Proto-Emberá by Constenla and Margery (1991), see the corresponding Spanish article.

== See also ==
- Embera-Wounaan, who speak the Choco languages, Embera and Wounaan
- Quimbaya language

== Bibliography ==
- Campbell, Lyle. (1997). American Indian languages: The historical linguistics of Native America. New York: Oxford University Press. ISBN 0-19-509427-1.
- Constenla Umaña, Adolfo; & Margery Peña, Enrique. (1991). Elementos de fonología comparada Chocó. Filología y lingüística, 17, 137-191.
- Greenberg, Joseph H. (1987). Language in the Americas. Stanford: Stanford University Press.
- Gunn, Robert D. (Ed.). (1980). Claificación de los idiomas indígenas de Panamá, con un vocabulario comparativo de los mismos. Lenguas de Panamá (No. 7). Panama: Instituto Nacional de Cultura, Instituto Lingüístico de Verano.
- Kaufman, Terrence. (1990). Language history in South America: What we know and how to know more. In D. L. Payne (Ed.), Amazonian linguistics: Studies in lowland South American languages (pp. 13–67). Austin: University of Texas Press. ISBN 0-292-70414-3.
- Kaufman, Terrence. (1994). The native languages of South America. In C. Mosley & R. E. Asher (Eds.), Atlas of the world's languages (pp. 46–76). London: Routledge.
- Loewen, Jacob. (1963). Choco I & Choco II. International Journal of American Linguistics, 29.
- Licht, Daniel Aguirre. (1999). Embera. Languages of the world/materials 208. LINCOM.
- Mortensen, Charles A. (1999). A reference grammar of the Northern Embera languages. Studies in the languages of Colombia (No.7); SIL publications in linguistics (No. 134). SIL.
- Pinto García, C. (1974/1978). Los indios katíos: su cultura - su lengua. Medellín: Editorial Gran-América.
- Rendón G., G. (2011). La lengua Umbra: Descubrimiento - Endolingüística - Arqueolingüística. Manizales: Zapata.
- Rivet, Paul; & Loukotka, Cestmír. (1950). Langues d'Amêrique du sud et des Antilles. In A. Meillet & M. Cohen (Eds.), Les langues du monde (Vol. 2). Paris: Champion.
- Sara, S. I. (2002). A tri-lingual dictionary of Emberá-English-Spanish. (Languages of the World/Dictionaries, 38). Munich: Lincom Europa.
- Suárez, Jorge. (1974). South American Indian languages. The new Encyclopædia Britannica (15th ed.). Chicago: Encyclopædia Britannica.
- Swadesh, Morris. (1959). Mapas de clasificación lingüística de México y las Américas. México: Universidad Nacional Autónoma de México.
- Tovar, Antonio; & Larrucea de Tovar, Consuelo. (1984). Catálogo de las lenguas de América del Sur (nueva ed.). Madrid: Editorial Gedos. ISBN 84-249-0957-7.
