= Emberá Chamí =

Emberá language spoken in Colombia

Chami
- Êbêrâ Β'e'dea
- Native to: Colombia
- Native speakers: (7,800 cited 2001–2014)
- Language family: Chocoan: Emberá; Southern; Chami

Language codes
- ISO 639-3: Either: cmi – Chami tdc – Tadó
- Glottolog: uppe1440
- ELP: Southern Emberá
- Linguasphere: 81-EIA-af
- 81-EIA-ag
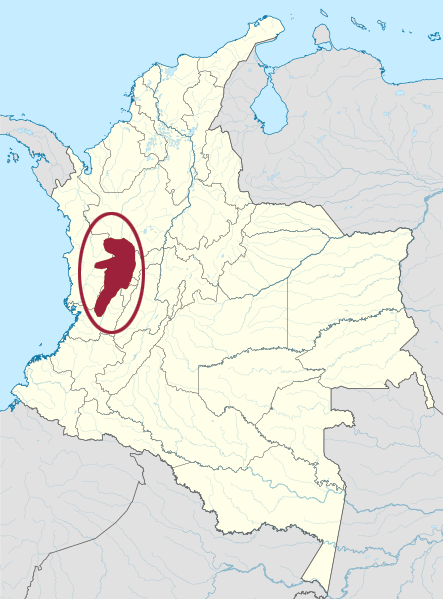

Chamí Emberá a.k.a. Chami is an Embera language of Colombia.

== Phonology ==
=== Consonants ===
		Bilabial	Alveolar	Palatal	Velar	Glottal
Stop	plain	p ⟨p⟩	t ⟨t⟩		k ⟨k⟩	ʔ ⟨ꞌ⟩
Stop	voiced	b ⟨b⟩	d ⟨d⟩			
Stop	implosive	ɓ ⟨ɓ⟩	ɗ ⟨ɗ⟩			
Fricative			s ⟨s⟩		(x ⟨j⟩)	h ⟨j⟩
Affricate				t͡ʃ ⟨ch⟩		
Nasal		m ⟨m⟩	n ⟨n⟩			
Liquid	trill		r ⟨rr⟩			
Liquid	tap		ɾ ⟨r⟩			
Approximant		w ⟨w⟩		j ⟨y⟩		

/h/ may also be heard as [x] in free variation.

=== Vowels ===
		Front	Central	Back	
		Front	Central	unrounded	rounded
High	oral	i ⟨i⟩		ɯ ⟨ɯ⟩	u ⟨u⟩
High	nasal	ĩ ⟨ĩ⟩		ɯ̃ ⟨ɯ̃⟩	ũ ⟨ũ⟩
Mid	oral	e ⟨e⟩			o ⟨o⟩
Mid	nasal	ẽ ⟨ẽ⟩			õ ⟨õ⟩
Low	oral		a ⟨a⟩		
Low	nasal		ã ⟨ã⟩		
