= Eperara language =

Chocoan language spoken in Colombia

Eperara
- Saija
- epérã pedée, sía pedée
- Native to: Colombia
- Native speakers: 3,600 in Colombia and Ecuador (2004–2012) plus an unknown number in Panama
- Language family: Chocoan: Emberá; Southern; Eperara

Language codes
- ISO 639-3: sja
- Glottolog: epen1239
- ELP: Epena
- Linguasphere: 81-EIA-ai
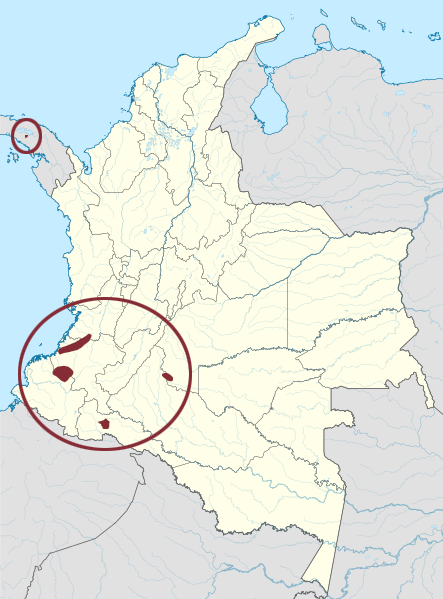

Eperara a.k.a. Epena (Southern Embera, Epena: Epérã Pedée 'person words', sía pedée) is an Embera language of Colombia, with about 250 speakers in Ecuador.

== Geographic distribution ==
Epena is spoken on the Pacific coastal rivers of the departments of Nariño, Cauca, and Valle del Cauca in Colombia. A major grouping of the Epena is found in Cauca along the Saija River and three of its major tributaries: the Guangüí, Infí, and Cupí. Social contact and intermarriage with the neighboring Wounaan is commonplace.

The Basurudó dialect is spoken on the Basurudó River in the Department of the Chocó, near the Docampadó River. It is the only Epena dialect that differs significantly from the others.

In Ecuador, only 30 to 50 speakers of Epena remained as of 2014, where the language is spoken in Esmeraldas Province, making it critically endangered there.

== Phonology ==
=== Consonants ===
		Bilabial	Alveolar	Palatal (-alveolar)	Velar	Glottal
Plosive/ Affricate	tenuis	p	t	t͡ʃ	k	ʔ
Plosive/ Affricate	aspirated	pʰ	tʰ		kʰ	
Plosive/ Affricate	voiced	b ~ m	d ~ n		ɡ	
Nasal		b ~ m	d ~ n	j ~ ɲ		
Approximant		w ~ w̃	(l)	j ~ ɲ		
Fricative		w ~ w̃	s ~ s̃			h ~ h̃
Vibrant	trill		r			
Vibrant	tap		ɾ ~ ɾ̃			

- The voiced consonant phonemes /b, d, ɾ, s, h, w, j/ have nasal allophones of [m, n, ɾ̃, s̃, h̃, w̃, ɲ], respectively, which occur in nasal syllables.
- /l/ is exclusive to loanwords.
- In medial position, /pʰ, kʰ, g, w/ may be realized as fricatives [ɸ, x, ɣ, β]. Both variants of /w/ have nasal allophones in nasal syllables, as in [w̃] ~ [β̃].
- /w/ may be pre-stopped [ᵍw] word-initially.
- /j/ also has the allophone [dʒ] in a single loanword, yérre [jéere ~ dʒéere] 'monkey'.

=== Vowels ===
	Front			Central			Back		
	short	long	nasal	short	long	nasal	short	long	nasal
Close	i	iː	ĩ	ɨ	ɨː	ɨ̃	u	uː	ũ
Mid	e	eː	ẽ	ə	əː	ə̃	o	oː	õ
Open				a	aː	ã			

=== Tones ===
There are three tones: high [◌́], low [◌̀], and rising–falling [◌̂ [sic]].

=== Harmony ===
Nasal harmony is a suprasegmental feature in Epena. It typically spreads rightward in a word, though sometimes also to the left, and is "associated with the syllable".

=== Phonotactics ===
Words in Epena may be composed of one to seven syllables, though most contain two to four. Consonant clusters are very rare, and may only be composed of two consonants.
