= Wounaan language =

Chocoan language of Panama and Colombia

Wounaan
- Noanamá
- Woun Meu
- Native to: Colombia, Panama
- Ethnicity: Embera-Wounaan
- Native speakers: 10,800 (2007)
- Language family: Chocoan: Wounaan

Language codes
- ISO 639-3: noa
- Glottolog: woun1238
- ELP: Waunana
- Linguasphere: 81-EIA-b
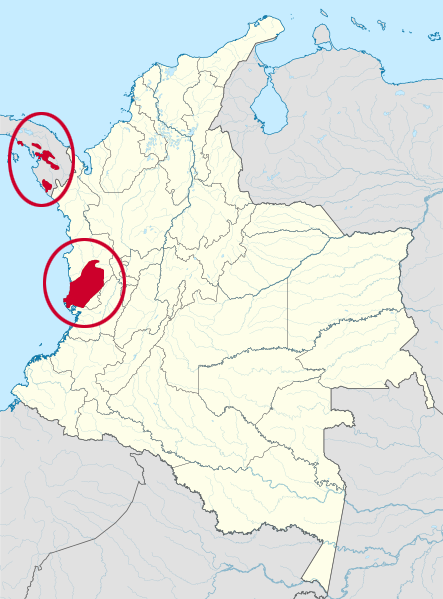

The Wounaan language, also known as Noanamá and Woun Meu, is a Chocoan language, with around 10,000 speakers on the border between Panama and Colombia.

== Phonology ==
The following tables show the vowel and consonant phonemes of Wounaan, transcribed using the International Phonetic Alphabet.

=== Vowels ===
Vowels
| | | Front | Central | Back | |
| | | Front | Central | unrounded | rounded |
|---|---|---|---|---|---|
| Close | oral | i | | ɯ | u |
| Close | nasal | ĩ | | ɯ̃ | ũ |
| Close-mid | oral | e | | ɤ | o |
| Close-mid | nasal | ẽ | | ɤ̃ | õ |
| Open | oral | | a | | |
| Open | nasal | | ã | | |

=== Consonants ===
| | | Bilabial | Alveolar | Palatal | Velar | Glottal |
|---|---|---|---|---|---|---|
| Stop | voiceless | p | t | | k | ʔ |
| Stop | aspirated | pʰ | tʰ | | kʰ | |
| Stop | voiced | b | d | | g | |
| Affricate | | | | | | |
| Fricative | | | s | ɕ | | h |
| Nasal | | m | n | | | |
| Approximant | | | l | j | w | |
| Trill | | | r | | | |
| Flap | | | ɾ | | | |

- /ɕ/ occurs as [t͡ʃ] across dialects, and as [ʃ] at the end of a word.
