= Embera-Wounaan =

Semi-nomadic indigenous people living in the Darién Province of Panama

Embera–Wounaan Chocó
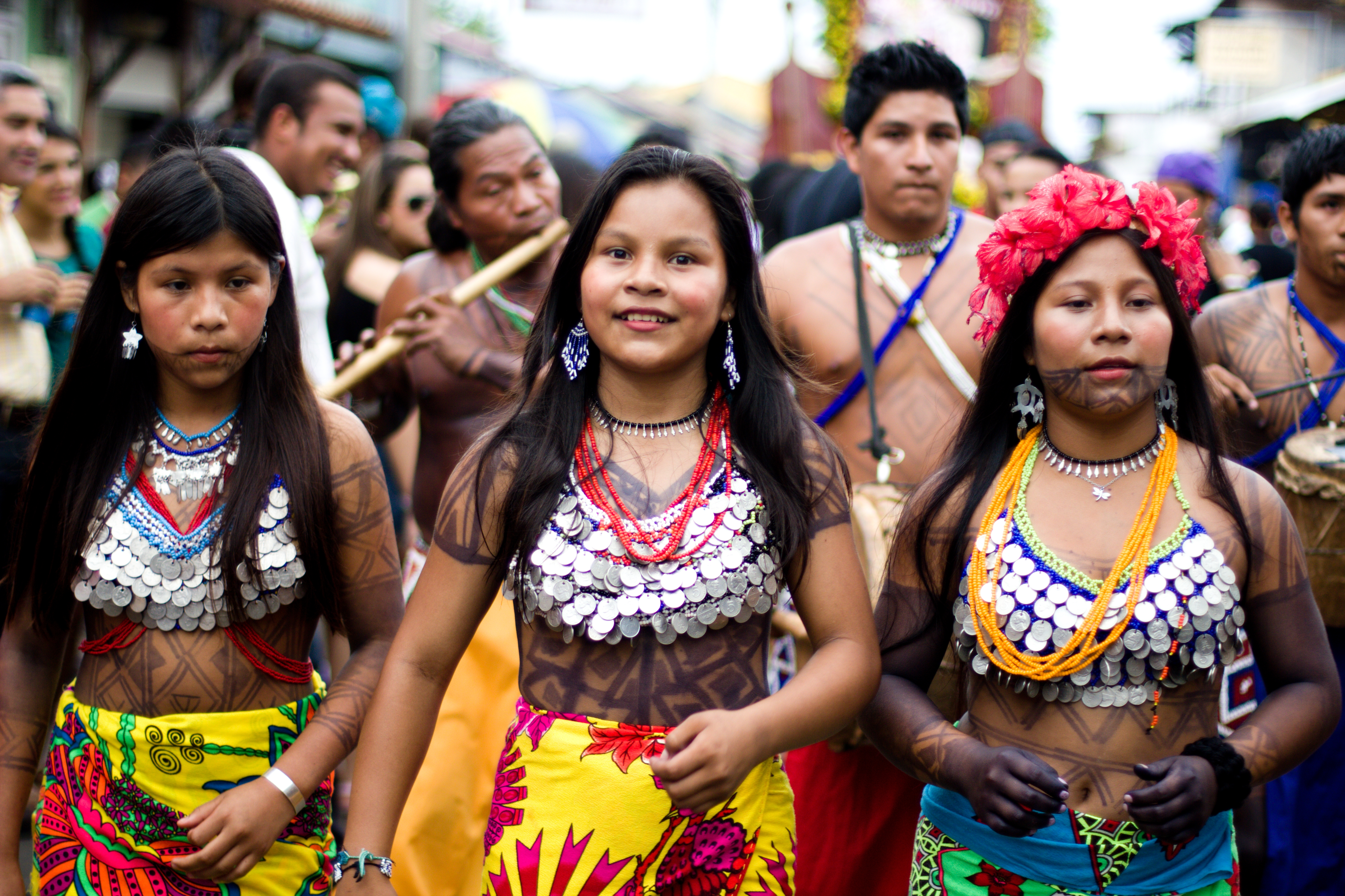
- Embera girls in a parade held in Chitré, capital of the province of Herrera, Panama.

Total population
- 15,000–16,000 (9,000–10,000 Embera and 6,000 Wuanana)

Regions with significant populations
- Colombia, Panama

Languages
- Choco languages

Related ethnic groups
- Caramanta people, Katío people

The Embera-Wounaan (also Emberá-Waunana, Chocó) are a semi-nomadic Indigenous people in Panama living in Darién Province on the shores of the Chucunaque, Sambú, and Tuira Rivers and their waterways. The Embera-Wounaan were formerly and widely known by the name Chocó, and they speak the Embera and Wounaan languages, part of the Choco language family.

== Name ==
The name Embera means "people". Collectively they are known as the Chocó and can be divided into two major groups: the Emberá, of upper Atrato and San Juan rivers, and the Wounaan (or Waunana) of the lower San Juan River. The Emberá are also known as the Atrato, Bedea, Cholo, Darién, Dariena, Eberá, Emberak, Emperia, and Panama Emberá people. The Waunaan are also known as the Chanco, Chocama, Noanama, Noenama, Nonama, Wounaan, or Wound Meu people. A third group of Chocó are called the Catío, who are also called the Embena, Epera, Eyabida, or Katio people.

== Housing ==
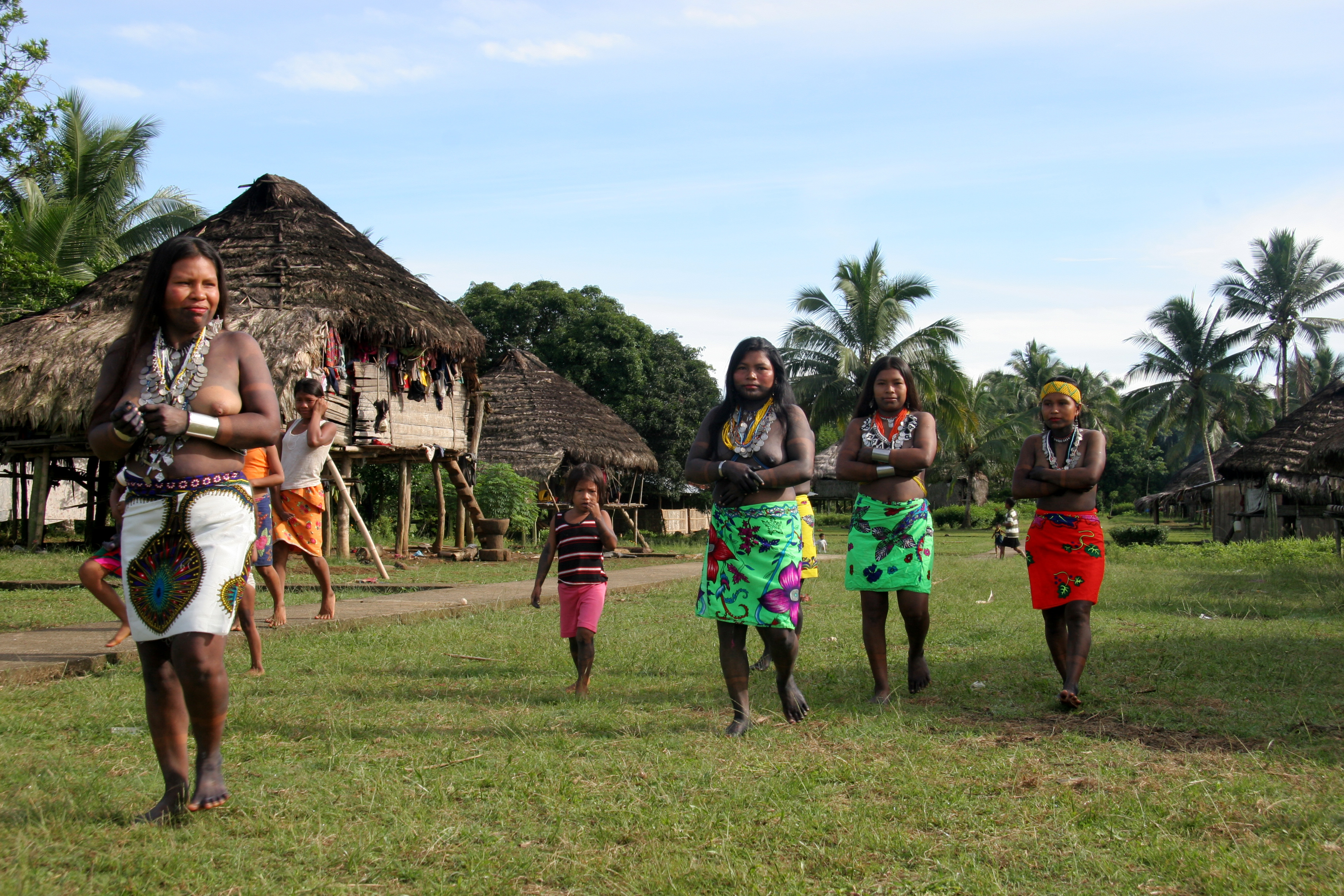
Embera dance in front of houses, 2006

The Chocó, or Embera, people live in small villages of 5 to 20 houses along the banks of the rivers throughout the Chucunaque/Tuira/Balsas River watersheds in the Darien Province of Panama. There are generally three villages on each tributary that branches off from the main river system. The villages are about a half day's walk apart. They are built on a small rise, set approximately 100 feet (30 m) in from the river. Around each village, the jungle is partly cleared and replaced by banana and plantain plantations, a commercial crop for the Embera, who sell them to get cash for their outboard motors, mosquito nets, and the like. The hills leading down to the river from the villages are usually hard packed reddish clay. There are sometimes large boulders being played on by naked children. Dugout canoes are usually seen pulled up on the riverbanks.

The Embera houses are raised off the ground about eight feet. They are set about 20–50 feet (6–15 m) apart, stand on large posts set in the ground, and have thatched roofs made from palm fronds. All the joinery is with bejuco vines. There are no walls, as the roof is tall. Hanging from the supporting posts and beams are hammocks, baskets, pots, bows and arrows, mosquito nets, clothing and other items. The floor is made of split black palm trunks or cana blanca (white cane), and have a kitchen built on a clay platform about three feet square; on top of this base they build a fire, supporting cooking pots over the fire with a tripod of sturdy sticks. The houses are accessed from the ground via a sloped log with deep notches for a ladder. They sometimes turn the notches face down at night in case wildlife tries to climb into the house while they sleep.

== Society ==
The Chocó people use matrilineal descent, practice polygamy and live in family units. The cacique, or chief, of the Chocó lives in the largest village and capital of the Chocó Nation, named Unión Chocó. The city is on the banks of the Tuira River.

The Chocó have their own form of government and live by their own set of unwritten rules. They avoid dealing with Panamanian National Police or any other branch of the Panamanian or Colombian governments. As they are not assimilated into Panamanian or Colombian society, the Embera people do not hold any civic positions and have no members who have become part of the Guardia Nacional in Panama. Healthcare is primarily provided by trained shamans.

The land is owned and farmed by the community. Everyone in the village pitches in to work at harvest time. If one hunter gets a larger animal, such as a peccary or a tapir, everybody in the village shares the meat.

== Economy ==
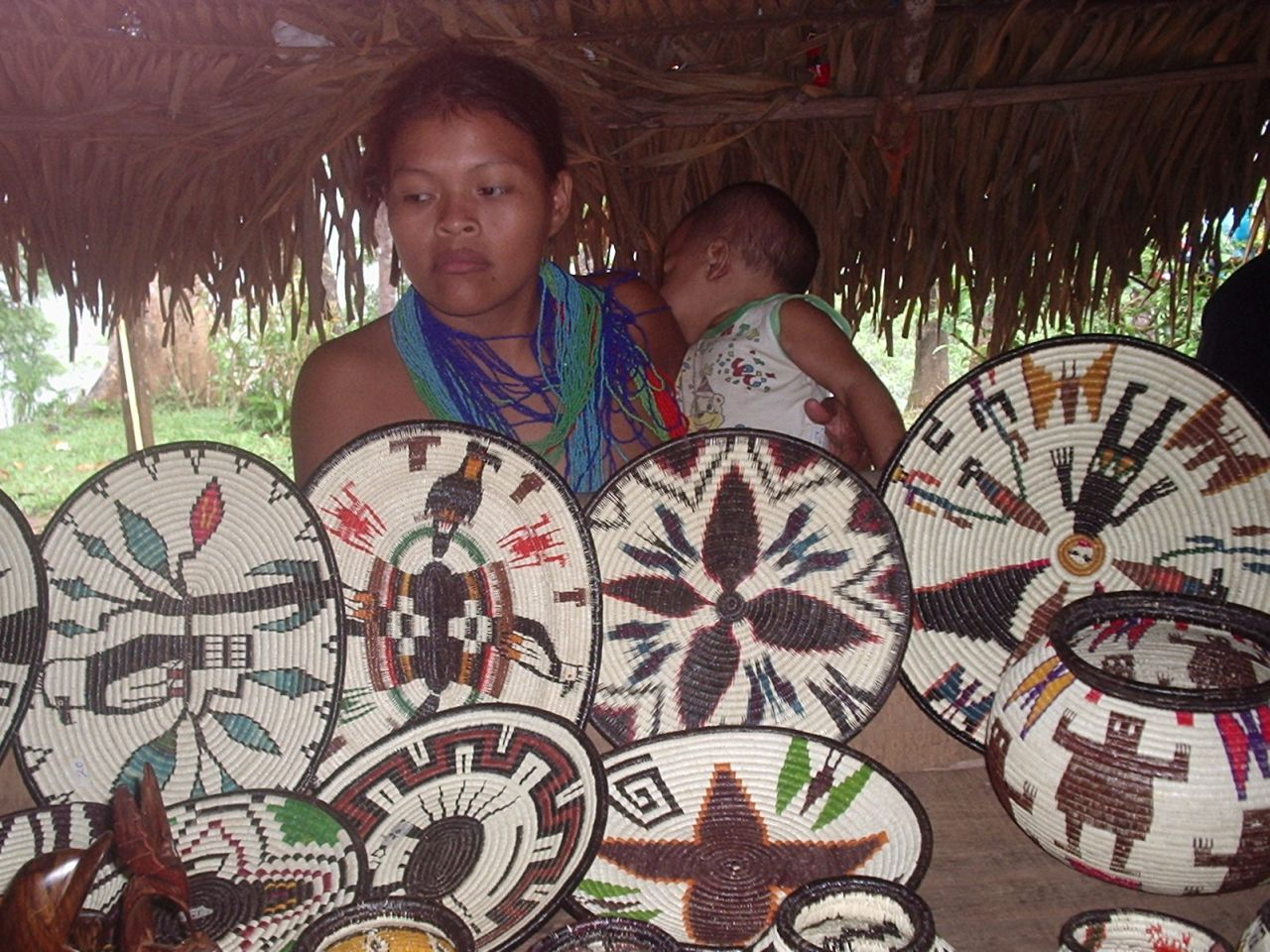
Embera woman selling coiled baskets, Panama

The calabash tree is important to the Embera, who scoop out the tree's gourds for cups and bowls, as well as spoons. Apart from wild fish and game, still hunted with snares, blow guns, bows and arrows, as well as firearms, an essential part of their diet is cassava, a poisonous root which must be pressed before cooking into a flatbread that stores well and can be used to absorb fluids during a meal. Some communities also farm rice, coffee, plantains and other plants as well as raise pigs, chickens and cattle for food.

== Appearance ==
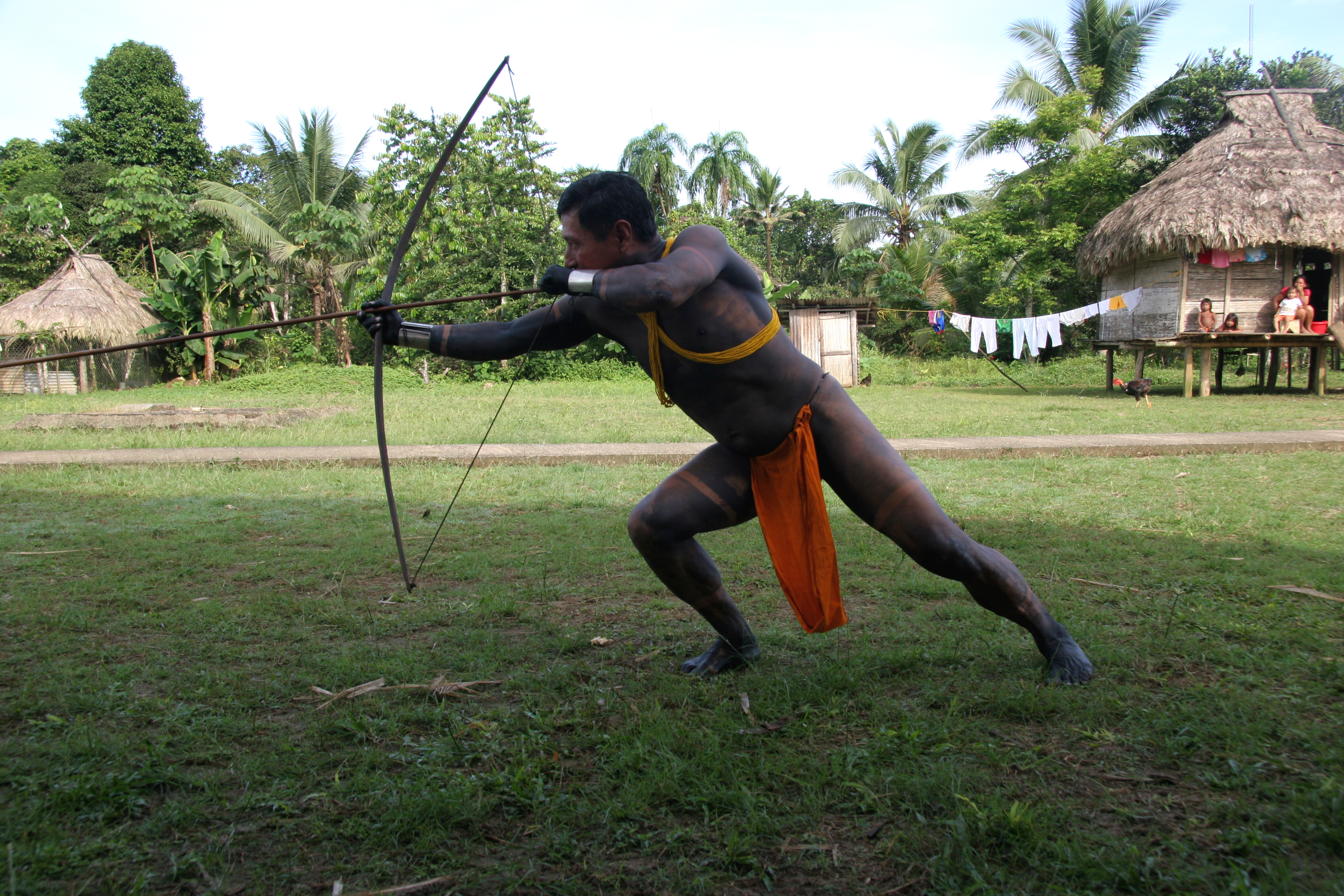
Embera man shooting a bow and arrow, 2006

Embera men sport "bowl cut" hairstyles and, when not in towns, traditionally wear nothing but a minimal loin cloth. Embera women wear brightly colored cloth wrapped at the waist as a skirt. Except when in towns, the women traditionally do not cover their torsos, and wear long, straight black hair. Embera children go naked until puberty, and traditionally no one wore shoes. However, traditional clothing is being replaced in some areas with western, manufactured clothing and shoes. In some communities, children attend schools requiring uniforms.

The embera paint their bodies with a dye made from Genipa americana, the berry of a species of genip tree. The black dye is thought to repel insects and the designs are known as jagua tattoos. On special occasions, using this same dye, they print intricate geometric patterns all over their bodies, using wood blocks carved from balsa wood. The women also wear silver necklaces and silver earrings on these special occasions, many of the necklaces being made of old silver coins. They punch a hole in the coin and run a silver chain through it. Many of the coins on these necklaces date to the 19th century and are passed down from mother to daughter.

== In Hollywood films ==
The Wuanana have appeared on screen in at least two Hollywood films. The first appearance was in Roland Joffé's The Mission, in which they portrayed the Guaraní living in the Iguazu Falls region of Argentina during the Guaraní War in the 18th century. Later they portrayed the Taíno and Carib in Ridley Scott's 1492: Conquest of Paradise, a film about Columbus' arrival in the Americas. The tribe performed alongside such notable actors as Robert De Niro, Jeremy Irons, Liam Neeson and Gérard Depardieu, as well as Sigourney Weaver, Armand Assante, Frank Langella, Ray McAnally, and others. Despite portraying other Indigenous peoples, the Wounaan speak their own language in both films.

The most notable members of the tribe to act were:

- Bercelio Moya, who portrayed the Indian Boy who always followed De Niro's character in The Mission, and Columbus' translator Utapan in Conquest of Paradise.
- Alejandrino Moya, who portrayed the Chief's Lieutenant in The Mission, and the Taino cacique Guarionex in Conquest of Paradise.

Other unnamed members of the tribe can be seen acting in both films.

Another film in which the Wounaan played other tribal peoples is The End of the Spear, which tells the story of four missionaries in Ecuador. Due to the difficulty of reaching the location where the events truly took place, the filming was done in Panama. The Wounaan actors learned how to use the weapons of the original tribe.

== See also ==
- Comarca Emberá-Wounaan, Indigenous territory in Panama
- Juradó Indigenous Reservation, Rio Quiparado Indigenous Reservation, Indigenous territories in Colombia, primarily inhabited by Embera-Wounan
- Chafil Cheucarama, Wounaan artist and illustrator.
