= Emberá languages =

Chocoan dialect continuum of Colombia and Panama

Emberá
- Chocó
- Geographic distribution: Colombia & Panama
- Ethnicity: Emberá people
- Native speakers: (undated figure of 100,000)
- Linguistic classification: Chocoan: Emberá
- Subdivisions: Northern; Southern

Language codes
- Glottolog: embe1258
- Linguasphere: 81-EIA-a
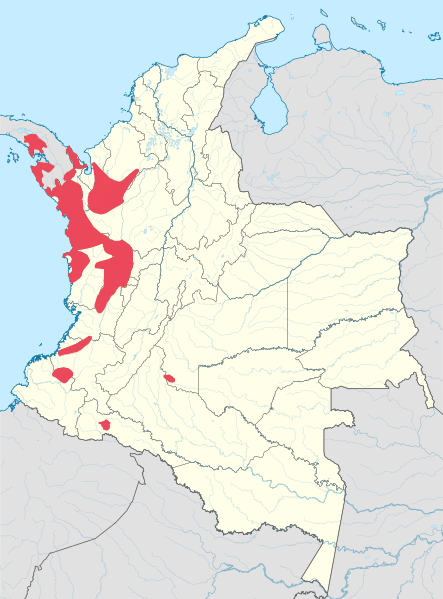

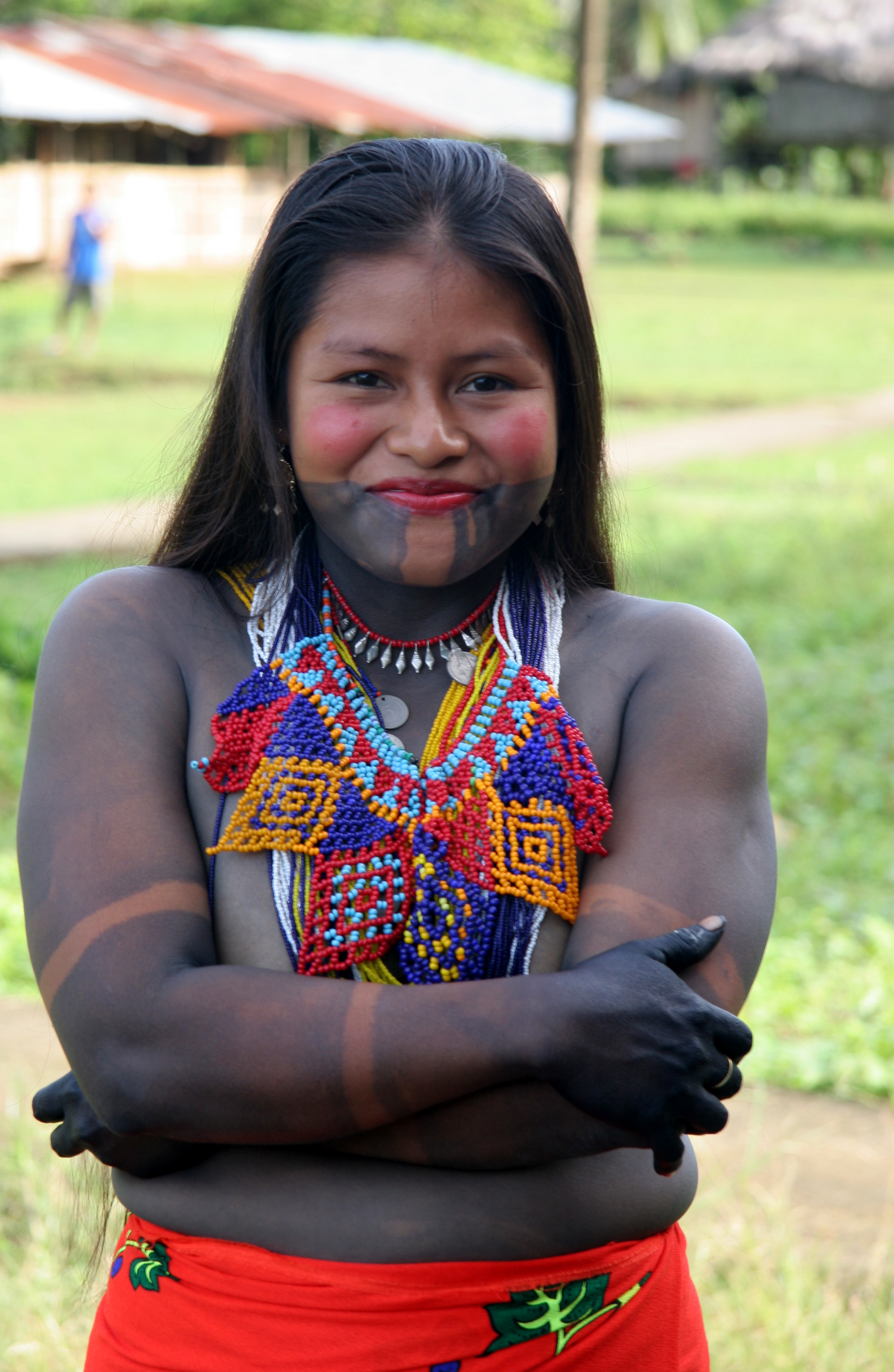
Young Embera woman from Panama

Emberá (also known as Chocó) is a dialect continuum spoken by 100,000 people in northwestern Colombia and southeastern Panama. It belongs to the Choco language family.

Embera, Emperã, Empena, Eberã, Epena, etc. is the Embera word for 'human being' or 'man' and is used as the autonym by all speakers of varieties of Embera (though not by the related Wounaan). It is also sometimes used to refer to other Indigenous people who are not of Emberá ethnicity.

== Languages and regional variation ==
Emberá is usually divided into at least two major groupings:

1. Northern Emberá
2. Southern Emberá

Each has a few regional varieties. These varieties are sometimes considered dialects but are actually distinct languages. The Archive of the Indigenous Languages of Latin America lists them as follows, along with alleged sub-varieties which may be places, extinct groups, or misspellings:

- Northern (Northern Antioquia, Emberá norteño)
  - Catío (Katío): Dabeiba, Tukurá (Río Verde, upper Sinú, Emberá-Katío), Ngverá (San Jorge)
  - Northern Emberá (Citará, Northwest Embera, West Embera): Darién (Sambú, Panamá Embera), Citará (Atrato, Andágueda), Juradó
- Southern
  - Chamí (Caramanta, Embera-Chamí, East Embera, Southern Antioquia): Tadó*, Cristianía, Upper Andágueda, Mistrató, Garrapatas
  - Baudó: Catrú, Dubasa, Purricha, Pavaja
  - Eperara (Epena): Joaquincito, Cajambre, Naya, Saija, Tapaje, Satinga

Ethnologue (2005, 2009) treats Tadó (*) as a separate language. A case can be made for classifying Baudó in the Northern Embera group. It has many features of both groups and is partially intelligible with the neighboring Northern Embera dialect as well as with Epena.

== Bibliography ==
- The archive of the indigenous languages of Latin America. (Web page: www.ailla.utexas.org/site/sa_lg_tbl.html, accessed 2005, Dec. 27).
- Aguirre Licht, Daniel. (1999). Embera. Languages of the World/materials 208. LINCOM. (in Spanish)
- Campbell, Lyle. (1997). American Indian languages: The Historical Linguistics of Native America. New York: Oxford University Press. ISBN 0-19-509427-1.
- Gunn, Robert D. (Ed.). (1980). Clasificación de los idiomas indígenas de Panamá, con un vocabulario comparativo de los mismos. Lenguas de Panamá (No. 7). Panama: Instituto Nacional de Cultura, Instituto Lingüístico de Verano. (in Spanish)
- Kaufman, Terrence. (1994). The Native Languages of South America. In C. Mosley & R. E. Asher (Eds.), Atlas of the World's Languages (pp. 46–76). London: Routledge.
- Loewen, Jacob. (1963). Choco I & Choco II. International Journal of American Linguistics, 29.
- Mortensen, Charles A. (1999). A Reference Grammar of the Northern Embera languages. Studies in the Languages of Colombia (No.7); SIL Publications in Linguistics (No. 134). SIL.
- Pardo Rojas, Mauricio y Aguirre, Daniel L. (1993). "Dialectología chocó". Biblioteca Ezequiel Uricoechea 11: 269–312. Bogotá: ICC. (in Spanish)
- Sara, Solomon (2001). A Tri-Lingual Dictionary of Emberá-Spanish-English. Lincom Europa. ISBN 3-89586-672-5

== See also ==
- Embera-Wounaan, who speak the Embera and Wounaan languages
