= Northern Emberá language =

Emberá language of Colombia and Panama

Northern Emberá
- Cholo
- Native to: Colombia, Panama
- Native speakers: (72,000 cited 2001–2012)
- Language family: Chocoan: Emberá; Northern; Northern Emberá

Language codes
- ISO 639-3: emp
- Glottolog: nort2972
- ELP: Northern Emberá
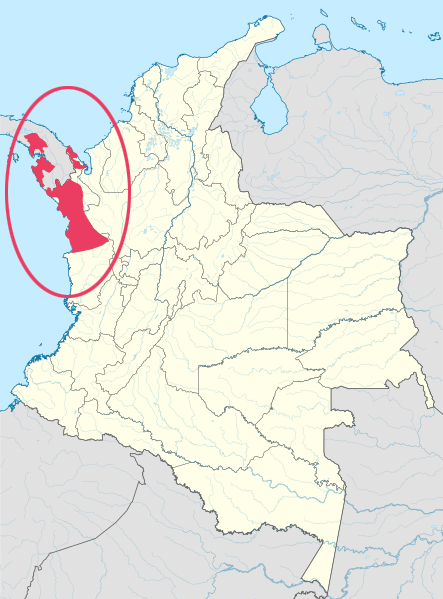

Northern Emberá, also known as West Emberá and Cholo, is the largest Emberá language. It is spoken largely in Colombia, but is also the principal language of the Darién Gap in Panama.

== Classification ==
Northern Emberá is a language that comes from Emberá which is part of the Chocoan family. The Chocoan family includes two principal groups, Waunana and the group of the Emberá languages. The Emberá languages form a dialect continuum with two geographically defined subgroups: the Northern branch contains Northern Emberá proper (referred to as just 'Northern Emberá' in Mortensen 1999) and the Catío language.

== History ==
The Waunanas and Emberás are the last remnants of a larger group of Pre-Columbian ethnic groups, such as the Orominas, the Chancos, the Guarras, the Burrumías, that were diminished during the Colonial period. Genetic findings show that the speakers of Chocó languages are genetically differentiated from the Chibcha speaking tribes of Northern Colombia and cluster with the Orinoquian and Amazonian indigenous populations. Waunana and Emberá share a large number of cognates (estimated to 50% by Loewen 1960: 12), which provide evidence for their common origin. However, there is no clear evidence in terms of a sufficient number of cognates for a common origin of Chocó with other South or Central American families.

== Geographic distribution ==
The majority of the Catío language are found along the Upper Sinu, San Jorge, San Pedro and Murri Rivers of northwestern Colombia with a few living in Panama. The majority of Darien Emberá speakers live in Panama with approximately 2,000 living in northwestern Colombia on the Atrato River.

== Phonology ==
=== Consonants ===
		Bilabial	Alveolar	Palatal	Velar	Glottal
Stop	plain	p	t		k	
Stop	voiced	b	d		ɡ	
Stop	implosive	ɓ	ɗ		ɠ	
Fricative			s			h
Affricate			t͡s	t͡ʃ	k͡x	
Nasal		m	n			
Rhotic	trill		r			
Rhotic	tap		ɾ			
Semivowel		w		j		

=== Vowels ===
	Front	Central	Back	
High	i ĩ		ɯ ɯ̃	u ũ
Mid	e ẽ		o õ	
Low		a ã		

== Grammar ==
=== Phonetic inventory ===
Catío's phoneme inventory contains 16 consonants (p, t, dɮ, t͡ʃʼ, k, b, d, g, s, h, m, n, r, u) and 6 vowels, both oral and nasal (a, e, i, o, u, ɨ). Darien Embera's phoneme inventory contains 17 consonants (p, t, k, b, d, dɮ, t͡ʃʼ, g, s, h, z, r, t, w, j) and 6 vowels, oral and nasal (a, e, i, o, u, ɨ).

=== Syntax ===
The Chocó languages show the properties of head-final languages: OV order, postpositions, embedded verbs preceding matrix verbs. At the clausal level, the basic order is SOV with some flexibility used for discourse purposes.

==== Noun phrase ====
The neutral order in the noun phrase is: [DP D [QP [AP [NP N] A ] Q ]. Determiners (D) precede the noun (N), while adjectives (A) and quantifiers (Q) are postnominal in the neutral configuration. Determiners include demonstratives, some indexical elements, as well as the definite determiner. The definite article is also used for the nominalization of non-nominal constituents.

==== Verbs ====
Verb clusters are linearized in a head-final pattern. The auxiliary follows the lexical verb, and the matrix verb follows the embedded verb. With non-verbal predicates, the auxiliary follows the predicative element. For example:

Ẽpẽrã-ra porekea b-ɯ-a.
person-ABS fat be-PRS-DECL
‘The man is fat.’

=== Reduplication ===
Reduplication is very productive and may be total, or partial. It is frequently used for the derivation of adjectives, and verbs. Verbs formed through reduplication have an iterative or durative interpretation. Reduplication is used to lessen the intensity of both verbs and adjectives.

p’ãwãrã ‘blue’	→	p’ãwã~p’ãwãrã ‘greenish-blue’
ip’ida ‘(to) laugh’	→	ip’ida~ip’ida ‘(to) smile’
pía ‘good’	→	pi~ʔia ‘very well’

=== Nasalization ===
In Chocó languages, the nasal feature spreads throughout a nasal morpheme, affecting vowels, sonorants and voiced obstruents. In Northern Emberá, regressive nasalization is reported to appear only with some speakers. The domain of nasalization is blocked by voiceless obstruents as well as by the multiple vibrant /r/.

=== Numbers ===
Number is marked on nouns and verbs. The singular is generally unmarked, while the plural is overtly marked. Within the noun phrase, plural is marked on the head, which is either a noun or a pronoun. Nominal plural is encoded by the morpheme -rã in Emberá. The plural suffix is highly integrated to the verbal inflection such that its form depends on tense; Northern Emberá -ta ‘PL’ in present/habitual and -da ‘PL’ in the past tense.

=== Tense ===
Northern Emberá and Catío make a clear distinction (immediate vs. unspecified temporal distance) in those tenses in which the event time point does not coincide with the speech time point (past and future) For example:

wã-toko-a {} vs. {} wã-podo-a
go-IMM_PST-DECL {} {} {} go-IMM_FUT-DECL
{‘s/he just left’} {} {} {} {‘s/he is about to leave’}

== Lexicon ==
Vocabulary of Darién Emberá, a Northern Emberá variety, with their English and Catío equivalents.

English	Catío	Darién Emberá	English	Catío	Darién Emberá
Heart	So	So	River	Do	Do
River channel	Dodú	Do nerả	Chonta palm	Meme'	Memé
Person	Ẽbẽrả	Ẽpẽrɑ̃	Soft (ground)	Sosoá	Susúa
Son in law	Wigú	Wigu	House	De	De
Woman	Wḗrɑ̃	Wḗrɑ̃	Seat	Buge	Ãpugé
Husband	Kĥimá	Kĥimá	Bedsheet	Buɾubá	Poɾoɓá
Wife	Kĥimá	Kĥimá	Dog	Usá	Usá
Father	Zéze	Zeza	Cebus monkey	Amisurá	Misurrá
Mother	Pĥápĥa	Pĥápĥa	Opossum	Bosãi	Posải
Water	Bánia	Báido			

=== Numbers ===
	Catío	Darién Emberá
One	Ába	Aɓá
Two	Umé	Umé
Three	Ũbéa	Õpeá
Four	Kĥimárẽ	Kĥimárẽ
Five	Wesomá	Huesomá
