= Andoque =

Andoque or Andoke may refer to:

- Andoque people, an ethnic group of Colombia
- Andoque language, a language of Colombia

== See also ==
- Andoquero language, a language of Colombia
- Andaqui (disambiguation) (a people and a language of Colombia)
- Andokides (disambiguation) (several persons of Ancient Greece)
