= Boran languages =

Bora–Witoto language of Brazil

Boran
- Bora–Muinane
- Geographic distribution: northwestern Amazon
- Linguistic classification: One of the world's primary language families (Bora–Witoto?)
- Subdivisions: Bora; Muinane

Language codes
- Glottolog: bora1262
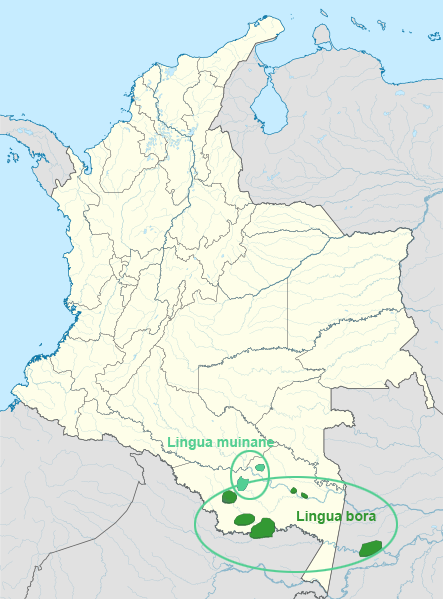

Boran (also known as Bora–Muinane, Bora–Muiname, Bóran, Miranyan, Miranya, Bórano) is a small language family, consisting of just two languages.

== Languages ==
The two Boran languages are:

- Boran
  - Bora (a.k.a. Bora–Miranya, Boro, Meamuyna) of western Brazil (Amazonas State)
  - Muinane (a.k.a. Bora Muinane, Muinane Bora, Muinani, Muename) of southwestern Colombia (Amazonas Department)

Loukotka (1968) also lists Nonuya, a Witotoan language, spoken at the sources of the Cahuinari River, as a Boran language.

Synonymy

- The name Muinane has been used to refer to the Muinane language (Bora Muinane) of the Boran family and also to the Nipode language (Witoto Muinane) of the Witotoan family.

== Genetic relations ==
Aschmann (1993) proposed that the Boran and Witotoan language families were related, in a Bora–Witoto stock. Echeverri & Seifart (2016) refute the connection.

== Language contact ==
Jolkesky (2016) notes that there are lexical similarities with the Choko, Guahibo, Tukano, Witoto-Okaina, Yaruro, Arawak, and Tupi language families due to contact in the Caquetá River basin region.

An automated computational analysis (ASJP 4) by Müller et al. (2013) found lexical similarities with Arawakan (especially the Resigaro language in particular) due to contact.

== Proto-language ==
Proto-Bora–Muinane
- Reconstruction of: Boran languages

Proto-Bora–Muinane reconstructions by Seifart and Echeverri (2015):

Proto-Bora–Muinane reconstructions by Seifart and Echeverri (2015)

no.	gloss	Proto-Bora-Muinane
1	tongue	*nehe
2	mouth	*i-hɨ
3	lip	*hɨni-ba
4	tooth	*iʔgai
5	nose	*tɨhɨ-ʔu
6	eye	*aʤɨ-ɨ
7	ear	*nɨ()-meeʔu
8	head	*niga-ɨ
9	forehead	*ɨme-ku
10	hair	*-hee-
12	beard	*hɨkk()
14	chest	*ppeeɨ-he
15	woman's breast	*mɨppaino
16	abdomen	*iiʔba
18	shoulder	*hɨhe-ba
19	arm	*nokkɨ-gai
21	elbow	*()o()i
22	hand	*ʔutʦe
23	finger	*ʔutʦe-gai
24	fingernail	*ʔutʦe-gai-meeʔu
27	knee	*memu
29	foot	*ttɨʔaai
30	toe	*ttɨ-gaai
31	skin	*meeʔo
32	bone	*bakkɨ
33	blood	*tɨɨ
34	heart	*heebɨ-ɨ
35	lungs	*βaβa-ga
38	man	*m()a-mɨnaa-ppi
39	man	*gai-ppi
40	woman	*gai-go
41	people	*m()a-mɨnaa
42	husband	*tahe
43	wife	*taaba
44	father	*giʔiru, kaani
45	mother	*gaʔa-ro, *ʦeehɨ
46	baby, infant	*ʦeemono
47	old man	*amia
48	water	*nɨ-ppai()u
49	river	*too-ʔi, *muuai
52	swamp	*kaaha
56	fire	*kɨɨhɨ-gai
57	ash	*bai-giihɨ
58	charcoal	*kɨɨhɨgai-
60	firewood	*kuu
61	sky	*nikko-he
62	rain	*niiha-ba
64	sun	*nɨʔba
65	moon	*nɨʔba
66	star	*meekɨrɨ-gai
67	day	*kuuhe
68	night	*pokku
69	thunder	*ʦitʦi
71	rainbow	*tɨɨ-ʔi
72	earth	*hiinɨ-he
74	sand	*n()gai-jɨʔai
75	house	*ha
77	doorway	*gooʔu-ga
78	seat, stool	*ikka-ga
79	mat	*kɨga-
80	hammock	*gaaiba
81	bed	*kɨga-
82	cooking pot	*giri-ʔʤu
83	cultivated clearing	*gaikkuʔai
84	village	*kuumii
85	path, trail	*hɨɨ-
86	fish net	*ʦ()nɨkuʔu
87	fish hook	*piikkɨ-gai
88	steel axe	*hɨgaa-he
89	knife	*n()ʦ()-ga-
90	canoe	*meeno
91	paddle	*buʔdu-ga
92	club	*gai-ʔuɨ
93	spear	*aamɨ-
94	bow	*tɨɨbu-ga
95	arrow	*tɨɨbu-
96	blowgun	*gitʦɨ-hɨ
99	puma	*tɨpai-ʔuu()
100	armadillo	*gooɨ
101	dog	*ʔuuʔi
102	red deer	*niiβɨ-gai
103	bat	*kikiih()
104	otter	*ʦukku
105	cebus, monkey	*kɨʔʤiba
107	spider monkey	*kɨɨmɨ
109	anteater	*heehɨ, *tuuʔhe
110	paca	*takkɨ
111	crocodile	*niʔba, *m()ʔduba
112	iguana	*maaina-ʔu
115	collared peccary	*mooni
116	white-lipped peccary	*paapaiba
117	agouti	*pattɨ
118	rat	*giʔpo
119	cat	*miiʧii
120	mouse	*giʔpo
121	tail	*bu
122	snake	*hiinimo
123	anaconda, water boa	*buua, *iigai-
124	rattlesnake	*taakaʔo
125	coral snake	*ʧiraagai
126	toad	*hakuga, ()ɨɨriʔi, nihaga, mɨɨʔmeba, haakkɨba
128	hummingbird	*paaibe
129	macaw	*heeβaa, *in()ʔai
130	toucan	*nɨgo
133	buzzard	*ainɨ
134	curassow	*kɨga-
136	guan	*peeka-he
137	hen	*ka()a()a
139	piranha	*gaikku-he, *nitta
142	flea	*hɨɨku-ga
143	louse	*gaaini-ʔu
144	mosquito	*gaaihɨ
145	termite	*maʔarɨ
146	ant	*piimo
147	spider	*paaga-
148	jigger (Tunga penetrans)	*niipahe
149	bush	*bahɨ
150	open grassland	*namettɨhe, *ʦukkum()he
151	hill	*gahɨɨ, *baaɨɨ
152	tree	*ɨmo-ʔo
153	leaf	*aame
154	tree leaf	*-ʔaame
158	root	*ba(i)(k)ko-
159	seed	*batʦu-
160	stick	ɨmoo-ʔi
161	grass	*ʦukkume-he
163	cassava (bread)	*máaʔu
165	tobacco	*baino
166	cotton	*haʔdi
167	gourd	*duutu
168	yam	*kɨnii-
170	annatto	*nooba-ba
171	chili pepper	*dee-ʔuɨ
172	coca	*hiibii-
173	banisterium	*bakko
174	plantain	*ɨhe-
175	chonta palm	*moomo
179	salt	*ɨmo
180	chicha (of peach palm fruits)	*moomo-ba
181	one	*ʦaa-no
182	two	*mi-no-kɨ
185	five	*sa-ʔutʦe
191	first	*ttɨkkonɨ
192	last	*niiʔnoo-
194	drum	*kɨɨmɨ-ba
196	ear ornament	*nɨhɨ-ga
197	mask	*maaʔnii
198	medicine man	*taabu-mɨnaa-ppi
199	chief	*aiβohɨɨ-bo
200	I	*uu
201	thou	*ɨɨ
202	he	*aanɨɨ, *dii-bo
203	she	*aaimoo, *dii-go
204	it	*haa-no
205	we	*mɨɨʔai
206	ye	*amɨɨai
207	they	*dii-to
208	my hand	*tai-ʔutʦe
209	thy hand	*dii-ʔutʦe
210	his hand	*dii-bo-ʔutʦe
211	our hands	*mo-ʔutʦe-no
212	your hands	*amɨɨʔai ʔutʦe-no
213	their hands	*diito ʔutʦe-no
214	my bow	*tai-tɨɨbu-ga
215	thy bow	*dii-tɨɨbu-ga
216	his bow	*dii-bo tɨɨbu-ga
217	our bow	*mo-tɨɨbu-ga
218	your bow	*amɨɨʔai tɨɨbu-ga
219	their bow	*dii-to tɨɨbu-ga
220	big	*mita-no, *giraa
221	small	*nume-
222	cold	*ʦɨɨku
223	hot	*aiguukku
224	good	*imi
225	bad	*imi-tɨ-no
226	white	*ʦeʦee
227	black	*kɨβo-
228	go!	*di-po
229	come!	*di-ʦaa
230	eat!	*matʧu
231	drink!	*d-aduu
232	sleep!	*kɨga
234	front teeth, incisors	*iiʔgai-noo
235	tip of tongue	*nehe-()-nih()kk()
236	long hair	*niiga
240	lower arm	*nokkɨ-
241	wrist	*ʔutʦe-kkohe
242	lower leg	*takki-
243	body hair	*iʔhee-no
244	stomach	*iiʔba
245	intestines	*iiʔba
246	old woman	*koomo-go
249	corn field	*gaikkuʔai, *-pagi
250	stream	*too-ʔi
251	pebbles	*n()gai-ɨʔai
253	path	*hɨɨ()ai
255	shelter	*nɨɨh()-ga
256	this	*hi-
257	that	*hoʔ-
258	who	*mɨ-, *ka-
260	not	*ʦaʔa, *-tɨ
261	all	*pa-no
262	many	*mita-
263	long	*kaamo-
264	bark	*-meeʔu
265	flesh	*ʔookuu, *duu
266	blood	*tɨɨ-
267	grease	*dɨɨrɨ-ba
268	egg	*iiʔɨ
269	horn	*-ttu
270	feather	*i-hee-no
271	claw	*ʔutʦe-gai-meeʔu
272	belly	*iiʔba
273	liver	*iʔganoo
274	drink	*adu
275	eat (non meat)	*matʧu
276	bite	*eeʔdu-
277	see	*aittɨme
278	hear	*goobu-
279	know	*gaaha
280	sleep	*kɨga
281	die	*gihe-βo
282	kill	*gɨhe-βo-ʦu
283	swim	*itʦi
284	fly	*gaʔpo
285	walk	*ɨgo, *poo
286	come	*ʦaa-
290	give	*akkɨ
291	say	*hɨɨb()go, *noo
293	mountain	*gahɨɨ, *baaɨɨ
294	red	*tɨ-ppai-no
295	green	*aittɨβa
296	yellow	*gi()
297	full	*gaʔpo
298	new	*boʔ-no
301	name	*momo
302	how	*mɨʔ()ɨ
305	here	*hi-noo-ri
306	there	*oo-no
307	other	*ʦi-ppi
309	fog	*tʦu-
310	flow	*niiβa
311	sea	*muuai
312	wet	*peepai-no, *maa-
313	wash	*nittɨ-
314	worm	*hɨʔba
316	fur	*iʔhe-
318	saliva	*hɨɨ-
319	milk	*mɨppaino-ppai()u
320	with	*-ma
321	in	*paino
322	at	*-βɨ
323	if	*-ʔatʧiihɨ
327	child	*ʦee-mo-no
328	dark	*kɨβo-
330	wide	*kare-
331	narrow	*iihe
334	thick	*peeme
335	thin	*ɨtʦi-, aini-
336	short	*baaʔr()-no
338	dull	*ʦɨɨʔhe-βa-tɨ-no
339	sharp	*ʦɨɨhe-βa
340	dirty	*hiinɨ-βa-, beeβa-
341	rotten	*tuukɨ-
342	smooth	*p()rɨɨkɨ-, *mooβa-
343	straight	*ʦa-tɨkko-βo
344	correct	*m()aa-
345	left	*nani-
346	right	*()m()a-
347	old	*ʦɨk()-, *koomo-
349	pull	*giiɨkɨ
351	throw	*piku
352	hit	*iʤaaju
353	split	*ga()er()-
354	pierce	*kapaitɨ-ɨ()ɨ-nɨ
355	dig	*ʦooʔdi
356	tie	*ʦitʦɨ, *duʔhe-nɨ
358	fall	*aak()()o-
359	swell	*huuri-
360	think	*etʦam()i-
361	sing	*matʦi-βa
362	smell	*hɨgikk(), *utʦu
365	blow	*ebaʦu-, buuʦu-
366	fear	*igi
367	squeeze	*aamɨ-ʦu
368	hold	*ikka
369	down	*giino, baa-ri
370	up	*kamo
371	ripe	*naamo-
372	dust	*-giihɨ
373	alive	*buʔee-
374	rope	*gaaiba-ɨ
375	year	*pi(k)kaba
378	diminutive	*-g()ɨ
379	big river	*muuai
380	longhouse	*baa-(ʔ)o-ha
382	stone axe	*hɨgaa-he
383	machete	*n()ʦ()ga
384	deer	*hiibai
385	macaw (blue)	*in()ʔai
386	ant (conga)	*tɨɨp()-megai
387	bitter manioc (plant)	*peeka
388	push	?*ká()()()ʔaaku
389	find	*áittɨme
390	get ill	*dɨʔkɨ
391	squeeze manioc dough	*gáirɨɨʔaiɲɨ
392	germinate	*ííno
394	scream	*kóóβádííkku, *gái()a
395	keep	*toomo-
398	make	*móónɨ
401	cry	*taa
402	order, command	*gáʤúu, *táhɨɨʔba
403	get wet	*máa-, *péépai-
406	manicuera, manioc	*paikuumɨɨ
407	be born	*pííβo
408	urinate	*níppai
410	fart	*nobú
412	ask	*díʤu
413	taste	*nɨtʦu
414	stay	*pítá()
417	want	*ím()-go-, gáihɨ-, káβa-
418	grate	*kaʦu
426	alone	*i()-ro
427	dream	*tɨga
429	sweat	*tugaa
431	be hungry	áih()ba
434	itch	*áhé
435	roast	*garééku, ʦúʔkúʦu-
437	bring	*ʦ()βa
440	pay a visit	*ba
441	grassland	*namettɨhe
442	yesterday	*ííhɨ
444	inside	*paino
445	soft, tender	*paiβoo
446	happy	*im()
447	bitter	*paapai
448	fast	*góóβá
450	blind	*ái()ɨme-tɨ
451	dock, port	*mɨkku
454	face	*ɨme
456	basket	*hɨβiiba
458	foam	?*hɨ()aʔʦ()
461	middle	*pééno
462	thorn	*hanoo-tto
463	tall	*káamo
464	palm, Oenocarpus bataua	*kúume
465	medicine	*táábú
467	later on	*buun()
468	a lot	*giraa-
469	behind	*dóhɨku
471	full	*gaʔpo
474	peanuts	*máʦakka
475	yard, court (of maloca)	*g()-ʔátʦ()
476	crested oropendola	*héékkɨ
477	manioc starch drink	*kaʔgɨnɨku
478	arrive	*gátʦe-
479	oil	*dɨɨrɨ-ba-
482	sifter	*níttɨ-ba
484	spicy	*áiβo
489	dancing festival	*hɨɨbaimo
491	manioc squeezer	*gádameeʔu
492	mirror	*méékɨme
494	son	*ʔatʧi
495	we two	*mɨʦi, *mɨpe
496	you two	*amɨʦi, *amɨpe
497	they two (m.)	*dii-t()-ʦi
498	they two (f.)	*dii-t()-pe
499	her	*i-
500	eat meat	*duu
501	weave	*nɨɨ
502	lick	*neheʔku
503	healing blow	*hɨbu
504	downriver	*aam()hɨ
506	wake up	*aikko
507	fireplace	*kɨɨhɨgai
508	sieve	*níttɨba
509	dancing beam	*ʤari-ga
510	caimito fruit (Pouteria caimito)	*mɨʦééʦe
511	palm, Socratea exorrhiza	*háaʤa
512	leaves that produce black color	*kaatɨ
513	peach palm (Bactris gasipaes)	*moomo
514	Cecropia sp.	*taaβi-ʔo
515	macambo fruit (Theobroma bicolor)	*haaʔo
518	Inga edulis	*tɨɨʦi-ʔo
519	ceramic saucepan	*hɨgo-ba
520	uvilla fruit (Pourouma cecropiaefolia)	*báaku
521	rifle	*áinɨ-hɨ
522	palm, Astrocaryum chambira	*nehe
523	umarí fruit (Poraqueiba sericea)	*niimɨ
525	edible ant	*m()níiko
526	avocado (Persea americana)	*kúúhɨ
527	edible larvae	*áppai-ku
529	grater	*kaʦu
530	miriti palm (Mauritia flexuosa)	*íno-ʔo
532	pillars (of roundhouse)	*-ʔakkɨ
533	Lepidocaryum tenue palm (for thatching roofs)	*háhe
534	eat fruit	*geen()
535	chew coca	*dooikkɨ
536	feces	*namo
539	drown	*mákká-nɨ
541	pull out	*gáihúkku
542	get scared	*ígi
543	shame	*n()kúppé-go-
544	dance	*gaʔʦe
547	hunt	*taaβa
549	cook	*tɨ
550	catch	*ɨkkɨ
551	tell, narrate	*hɨɨb()go
553	cut	*βɨrɨ
554	shoot	*ainɨ
556	get drunk	*gírííká-βo-
557	woolly monkey (Lagothrix lagotricha)	*kɨmɨ
558	sweet	*naamo
560	masculine (suffix)	*-bo
562	conjure	*apiiʧu, *ʤɨɨ()a-nɨ

== Bibliography ==
- Aschmann, Richard P. (1993). Proto Witotoan. Publications in linguistics (No. 114). Arlington, TX: SIL & the University of Texas at Arlington.
- Campbell, Lyle. (1997). American Indian languages: The historical linguistics of Native America. New York: Oxford University Press. ISBN 0-19-509427-1.
- Echeverri, Juan Alvaro & Frank Seifart. (2016). Proto-Witotoan: A re-evaluation of the distant genealogical relationship between the Boran and Witotoan linguistic families.
- Kaufman, Terrence. (1990). Language history in South America: What we know and how to know more. In D. L. Payne (Ed.), Amazonian linguistics: Studies in lowland South American languages (pp. 13–67). Austin: University of Texas Press. ISBN 0-292-70414-3.
- Kaufman, Terrence. (1994). The native languages of South America. In C. Mosley & R. E. Asher (Eds.), Atlas of the world's languages (pp. 46–76). London: Routledge.
- Thiesen, W.; Thiesen, E. (1998). Diccionario: Bora - Castellano, Castellano - Bora. (Serie Lingüística Peruana, 46). Pucallpa: Summer Institute of Linguistics.
- Walton, J. W.; Walton, J. P.; Pakky de Buenaventura, C. (1997). Diccionario bilingüe muinane-español, español-muinane. Santafé de Bogotá: Editorial Alberto Lleras Camargo.
