= Augusto Jiménez Seminario =

Agent of the Peruvian Amazon Company

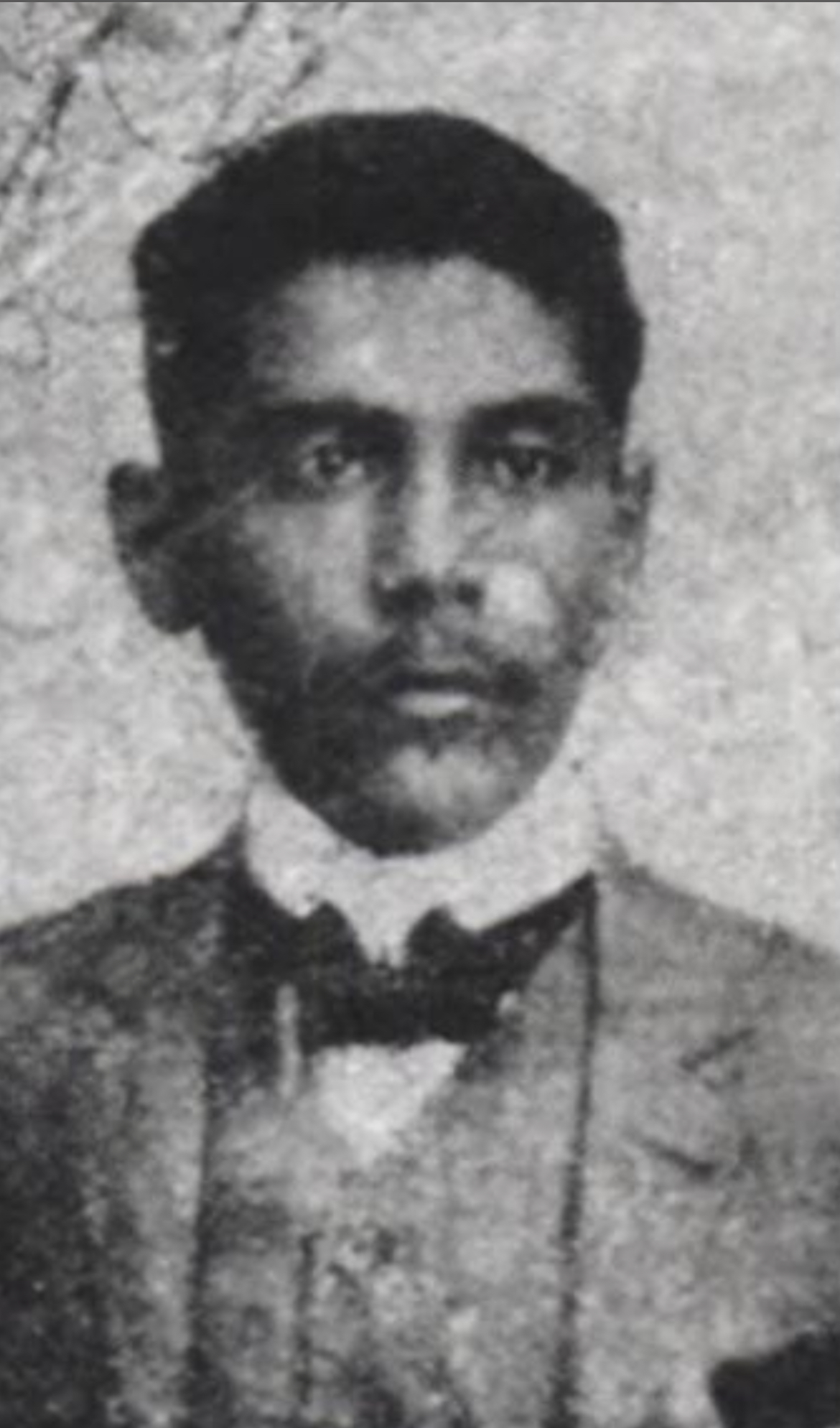
Photograph of Jiménez, circa 1915

Map of J.C. Arana y Hermanos territory around La Chorrera. Chorrera, Abisinia and Morelia are underlined. Santa Julia is also on the map, marked as S. Julia.

Augusto Jiménez Seminario was a Peruvian agent of the Peruvian Amazon Company, involved in the brutal exploitation of indigenous communities in the Putumayo River basin during the early 20th century. Jiménez was employed as an agent of Julio César Arana’s rubber firm J.C. Arana y Hermanos as early as 1904, this firm later became the Peruvian Amazon Company and they continued to employ Jiménez with management roles until 1911.

During his employment with Arana's rubber firms, Jiménez rose to a position of authority at the firm's agency of La Chorrera. He supervised forced labor, primarily among the Bora people located between the Igara Paraná tributary of the Putumayo River and the Cahuinari tributary of the Caqueta River. In 1904, he was appointed to manage the estate of Santa Julia, which had a port located on the lower Igara Paraná River. He was transferred to the estate of Abisinia in 1905 and subsequently served as the section's second in command, in subordination to Abelardo Agüero. Between 1906 and 1909, Jiménez managed Morelia, one of Abisinia's subsections, during this time period he became implicated with the deaths of many indigenous people, a large portion of which were held in captivity at Morelia or Abisinia. The Peruvian Amazon Company later appointed Jiménez as the estate manager of Ultimo Retiro, on the upper Igara Paraná River, Jiménez retained this position until 1911.

During his employment in La Chorrera's territory, Jiménez was implicated in a range of crime and violent practices. His role in the atrocities, which included killings, torture, and other abuses, was documented by multiple investigators, including journalist Benjamin Saldana Rocca, American engineer Walter Hardenburg, British diplomat Roger Casement, as well as the Peruvian judges Rómulo Paredes and Carlos Valcárcel. The Putumayo genocide, as this campaign of exploitation and violence came to be known, garnered international attention, sparking investigations and legal proceedings that named Jiménez and other company officials as responsible for severe human rights abuses.

In 1911, Jiménez was subject to an arrest warrant alongside other employees of the Peruvian Amazon Company. Jiménez was subsequently dismissed from the company and he fled the region with Abelardo Agüero as well as several other agents that were issued arrest warrants, they migrated towards Bolivia. These men trafficked a group of around seventy indigenous people, which the former intended to prevent from testifying to any judicial commissions and either sell the group of people or profit from their labour. The pair evaded incarceration until April 1914, at the time they were employed at a rubber producing estate which belonged to the Bolivian rubber baron Nicolás Suárez Callaú. Despite his arrest in Bolivia that year, Jiménez escaped detention and ultimately disappeared. His later life remains largely obscure, although reports suggest that he continued to operate near the Brazilian border, eluding justice until his death, which is not documented.

== Career ==
Augusto Jiménez Seminario was employed by a rubber exporting firm named J.C. Arana y Hermanos as early as 1904. This company was later implicated with perpetrating the Putumayo genocide, during which the Putumayo's indigenous people were exploited as a workforce to extract and transport rubber under the threat of death. Around 1904, Jiménez became the manager of the Santa Julia station, which was located on a tributary of the Igara-Paraná River and acted as the shipping port for rubber collected around the territory of Abisinia, an estate that belonged to J.C. Arana y Hermanos. Abisinia, Morelia, and two other stations sent their rubber towards Santa Julia, and from there the rubber was transported up the Igara-Paraná River towards La Chorrera. (Note: The journey from Santa Julia to La Chorrera could be completed in around twenty four hours by the Cosmopolita and Liberal steamships, which belonged to the Peruvian Amazon Company.) The indigenous people that lived between Santa Julia and Abisinia's territory were Boras, (Note: The distance between Santa Julia and Abisinia could be traversed in around twelve hours of walking according to Hardenburg's information. The Barbadian John Brown stated that a native carrying a load of rice from Santa Julia to Abisinia could take two days to complete the journey.) they were often targeted by slave raids organized by employees of J.C. Arana y Hermanos. Jimenez was transferred from Santa Julia to Abisinia in 1905, shortly after the first detachment of Barbadian men employed by J.C. Arana y Hermanos arrived at that estate.

The station of Abisinia was managed by Abelardo Agüero and during his employment at this estate Jiménez acted as Agüero's second in command. Jiménez later became the manager of Morelia, which was a substation that delivered rubber to Abisinia. (Note: Jimenez was referred to as the second chief of Abisinia under Agüero, and he was in charge of the station when Agüero was absent.) In 1907, Julio Cesar Arana registered the Peruvian Amazon Company in London, and this new company acquired the assets of J.C. Arana y Hermanos. Jimenez was listed as the manager of the Cahuinari section on the prospectus of this new company which was drafted by Eugène Robuchon and Carlos Rey de Castro. The Cahuinari section refers to the Palmera and Morelia stations near the Cahuinari River, a tributary of the Caqueta River. Ovidio Lagos, who published a lengthy biography on Arana, noted that the report published by J.C. Arana y Hermano's auditor in preparation for the Peruvian Amazon Company's registration "affectionally addressed" Armando Normand and Augusto Jiménez, two murderers which Lagos believes should "join the list of the worst sadists" of the 20th century.

In March 1910, Jiménez became the manager of Ultimo Retiro after the previous manager, Alfredo Montt, was transferred to the Atenas station. Roger Casement estimated that the rubber delivered to Ultimo Retiro in 1910 may have yielded around 25 tons of rubber, about £5,000, and Jimenez would have received a portion of that through commission. A copy of La Chorrera's paylist dated to 1910 stated that Jiménez was paid 3 Peruvian soles per arroba of rubber, which equals 15 kilograms or 33 pounds. The list also documented ten other employees at Ultimo Retiro, including Aquileo Torres who was receiving 100 Peruvian sols per month. During its prime, Ultimo Retiro had two thousand workers on the company ledger and by the time of Casement's investigation in 1910 the population consisted of "260 workmen". (Note: This population would fall down to around two hundred and one by 1912) In 1911, Casement stated that Jimenez was around the age of twenty six. The station apparently brought in 25 tons of rubber per annum supplied by the "260 workmen" who were enslaved to the company. Casement mentioned Jiménez drew a "fine percentage" of profit from the rubber brought to Ultimo Retiro.

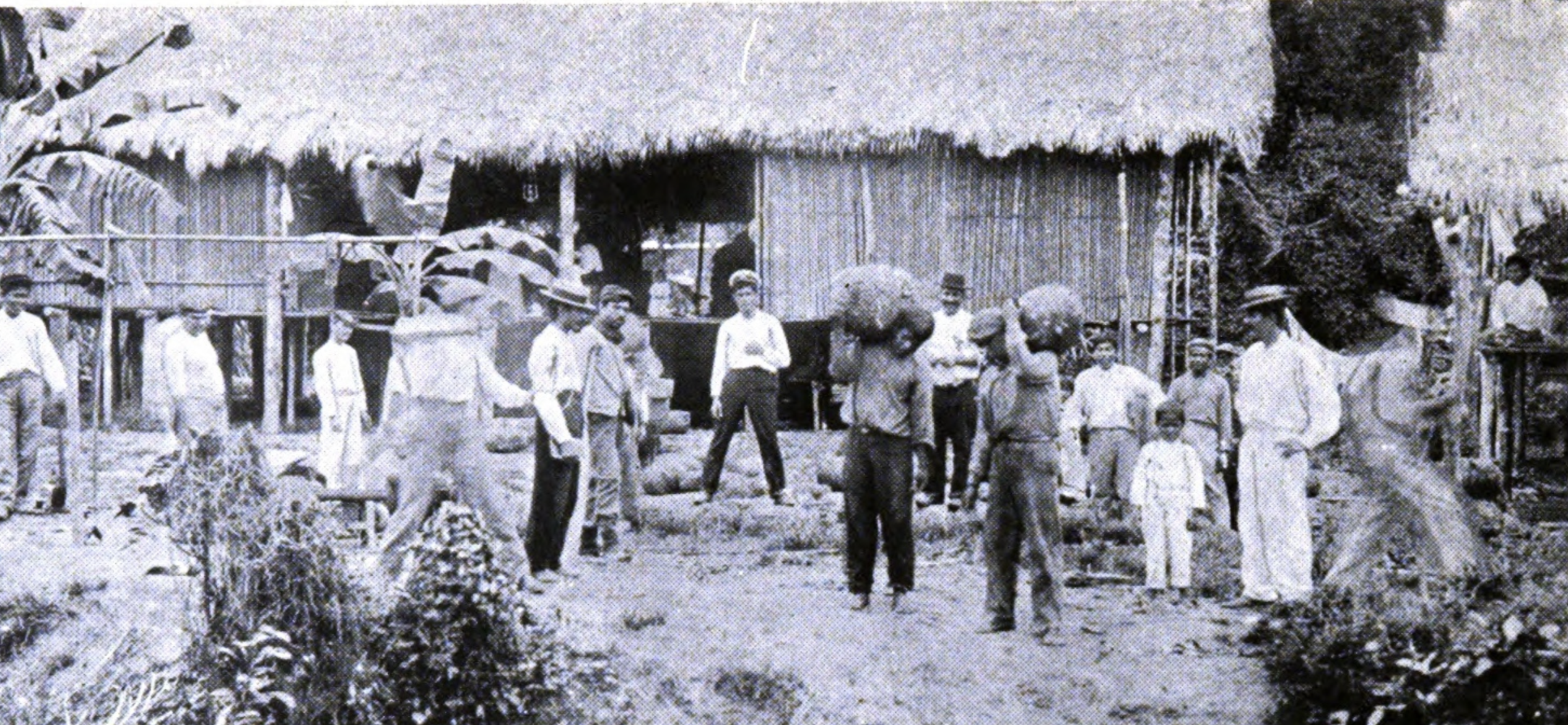
“Embarking the rubber”

According to Jiménez, the natives were paid with the advance system, and since they don't understand prices or quantity, he decided the quantity, prices and advances on the books. Casement stated "[i]t was clear there was no intention of paying these people, for there was nothing in the store to do it." (Note: "There are surely more concubines than saleable articles in this store.") While describing the method of rubber collection at Ultimo Retiro, Jimenez stated "the blancos did go out to the house of the capitanes and 'advise' them of when the rubber was due, and bring them in – this was twice in the fabrico". The term fabrico refers to a period of time, usually around seventy five days, during the year when there were ideal conditions to extract rubber.

== Role in the Putumayo genocide ==
Jiménez's role in the Putumayo genocide was first exposed by a criminal petition filed by Benjamin Saldaña Rocca against eighteen members of the J.C. Arana y Hermanos firm. When he received no response from the courts in Iquitos, Saldaña resorted to publicly attacking this firm through two different newspapers titled La Sancion and La Felpa. Saldaña published the contents of his original petition, as well as eyewitness reports to crimes occurring in the Putumayo, several of these witnesses implicated Jiménez with perpetrating crimes against the local natives. (Note: These eyewitness reports usually come from ex-employees of the J.C. Arana y Hermanos firm, or Colombians who had interacted with that firm.) Jimenez's name was included in a list of men implicated with the Putumayo genocide, reported by Marcial Gorries to Benjamin Saldana Rocca. Regarding Jiménez's inclusion in this list, Gorries wrote: "[T]he least criminal like Jimenez [killed] ten in two months". (Note: Jimenez is the fourth name in the list mentioned, following Armando Normand, José Inocente Fonseca and Abelardo Agüero. Gorries may have arranged the list in order of which station managers he viewed to be most abusive.)

Saldaña's information was later given to an American named Walter Ernest Hardenburg, and he collected further depositions and evidence which further exposed the crimes perpetrated by J.C. Arana y Hermanos as well as Jiménez. One witness who made a report to Hardenburg was named Celestino Lopez and he referred to Jimenez as the "author of various violations, arsons, floggings, and homicides." Another witness named Daniel Collantes also included Jiménez among his list of the worst criminals in the Putumayo. Casement would later include Jiménez in a similar list in 1910 after carrying out his own investigation. During his investigation, Casement wrote that the "evidence against him is overwhelming", as well as "he has committed appalling crimes upon the Boras Indians in the section Abisinia." In reference to Jiménez, the editor of Truth in 1909, Sidney G. Paternoster, stated that "his record of cruelty is appalling".

In reference to Jimenez and another criminal implicated in the Putumayo genocide, Casement wrote "[t]hose men were murderers and torturers by profession – as their crimes swelled so should their fortunes. Whole tribes were handed over to them by a lawless syndicate which had no title-deed to one yard of land or one sapling rubber tree, and they were supplied with the armaments necessary to reduce these people to a terrified obedience and given a wholesale interest in the terror." (Note: "Tizon, himself has again and again warned us that these agents of his are 'dangerous', are 'pirates', that Jimenez is a 'bandit', and that they have their cut-throat muchachos and the Indians entirely at their bidding and their mercy.")

In 1911, there were two judges sent to the Putumayo to search for further evidence and eyewitness testimony in regards to the Putumayo genocide. Judge Rómulo Paredes and the depositions he collected implicated Jiménez with the decapitation of fifty-five natives, (Note: This information comes from a native named Michechenibe Boras. This native also declared that Jiménez sent his muchachos after a woman named Quejiche because she fled, and the muchachos brought her severed head back. Her corpse was skinned afterwards and the skin was hung in the same room the cepo, a pillory like device, was kept. The rest of her body was burned.) innumerable killings, (Note: The muchachos Dubago Boras, Huacuchi Boras, Bushico Boras and Jose Maria declared that they had witnessed many killings carried out by Jiménez.) the rape of children, and many other crimes. (Note: Valcárcel mentions Jiménez raping children twice. The deponent Isais Ocampo declared that Jiménez had perpetrated more instances of rape than his boss Agüero.) In his report, Paredes mentioned that Jiménez employed a method of torture to extract a confession where he cut the feet of natives and had them whipped after stabbing them. A Colombian named Simón Muñoz testified to Paredes that another torture method used by Jiménez, consisted of having the natives hanged by their limbs and then flogging them. Afterwards, these victims were interred in the stocks, where Muñoz stated he had seen ten natives die from their wounds. One muchachos de confianza believed that Jimenez's actions had caused an entire indigenous nation to disappear.

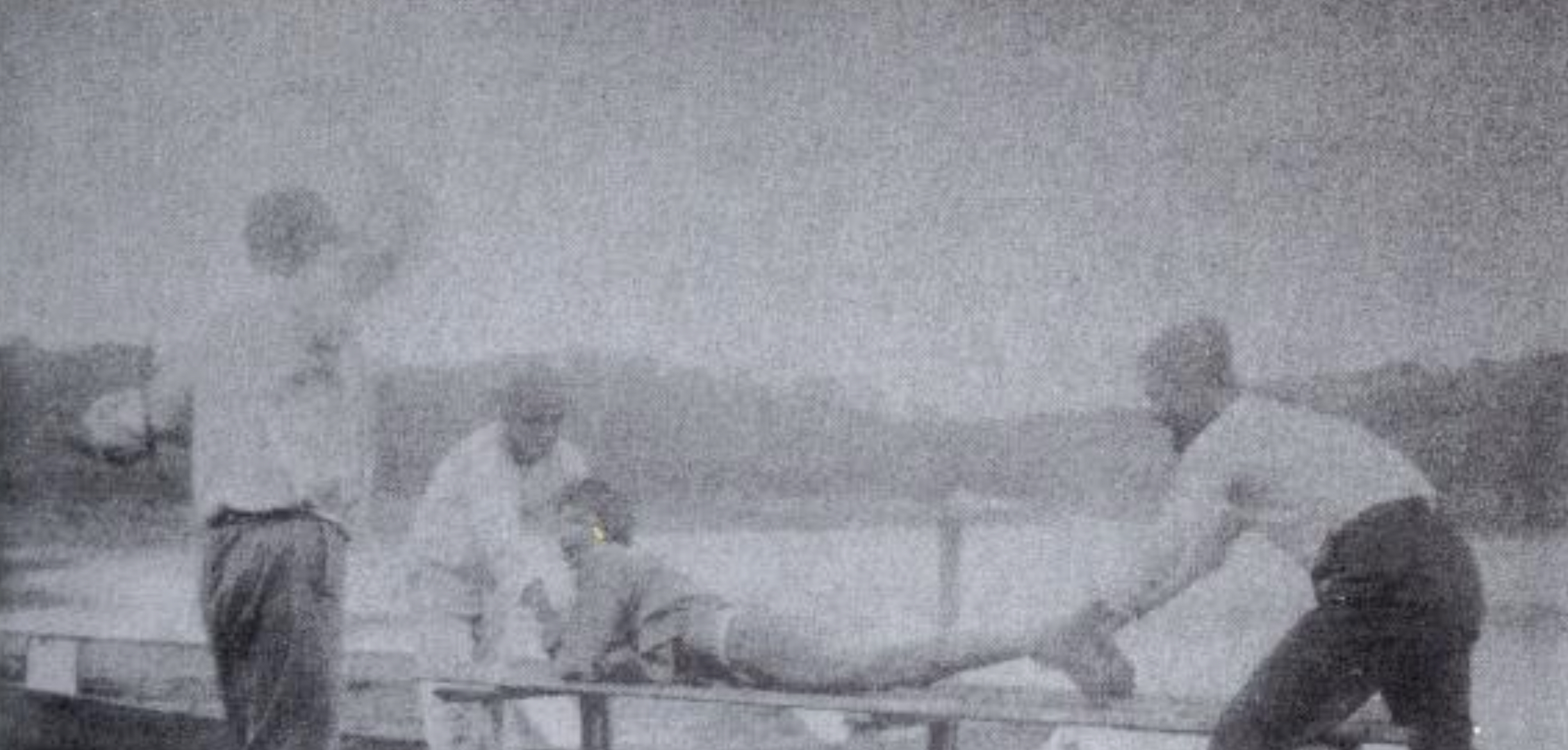
Flogging of a Putumayo native, photographed by Eugène Robuchon on one of Julio Arana's estates.

=== Abisinia ===
Joao Baptista Braga was one of the first deponents to incriminate Jimenez and Agüero in the Putumayo genocide. Braga's information dates back to 1904 and he was originally hired by the J.C. Hermanos firm to direct a group of sixty-five Peruvian men. In order to demonstrate their treatment of the natives to Braga, Jimenez and Agüero had eight natives tied to a post then executed because they had tried to run away. (Note: Valcárcel's information states that these were eight indigenous women, who were mutilated with machetes.) Around three months later, Agüero ordered Braga to execute thirty-five imprisoned natives because they had also attempted to run away. (Note: A muchacho de confianza named Dubago Boras gave his testimony to Paredes, and declared that he had helped Agüero and Jimenez kill thirty natives on one occasion. This was because Agüero and Jimenez feared that this group would revolt.) When Braga refused to do so, Agüero got Jimenez to do this.

There were twenty-one Barbadian men sent to Abisinia in 1905 that were employed on slave raids under Agüero and later Jimenez's management. Some of these Barbadians, like James Mapp, would later report and testify the crimes of Jiménez as well as Agüero. Mapp reported one incident in 1906, which occurred after Agüero had returned from a trip to Iquitos. Agüero asked Jimenez where a certain group of native prisoners had come from, and Jimenez stated that they had recently been caught. Agüero ordered this group of eight natives to be sent towards the native crop fields and executed by the muchachos de confianza one by one. Mapp's testimony was later corroborated by another Barbadian named John Brown.

In 1906, Jiménez led a relief expedition around the Cahuinari River in search of Eugène Robuchon, who was a French explorer that was hired by Arana to map out his property in the Putumayo River basin. Robuchon took several photographs, which were incriminating and depicted the enslavement of native peoples in the area. These photographs were later used as evidence of crime in the Putumayo, and became the subject of rumors that Robuchon was murdered and then disappeared. (Note: In the words of Walter Ernest Hardenburg, "[a]s he is known to have taken several photographs of the horrible crimes committed there, it is thought by many that he was victimised by the employees of Arana. Considering the character of these miserable criminals and certain other peculiar circumstances that are said to have taken place, it would not be strange if such were really the case.") It took fifty-eight days before this expedition, which was composed of twenty-five men, including John Brown, arrived at Robuchon's last known location. In an interview decades later, Brown stated that this expedition was just a "simulation" for him, because he believed that Arana had given an order for Robuchon to disappear, and Brown thought Robuchon had died before the relief group was sent. After searching the area, the relief expedition split up into two different groups, one of which became lost in the forest for five months. Brown was a part of the group that was lost, and several of his companions died. This would eventually influence Brown to leave the company, and report the incidents he had witnessed, including several crimes committed by Jiménez. Brown reported information regarding crime in the Putumayo in 1908 to Thomas William Whiffen and later Roger Casement in 1910.

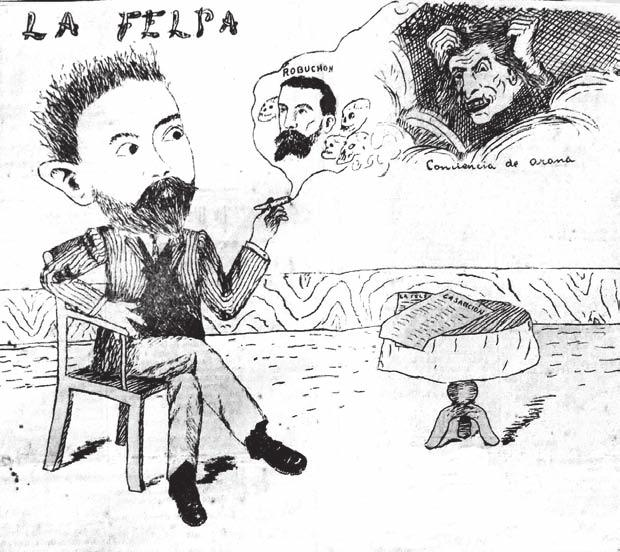
“The conscience of Arana.” The illustration is based on rumors that Julio Cesar Arana had Eugène Robuchon murdered

There were seven natives from the Huarunas tribe that were shot by Jiménez. A native named Ubatipa Boras declared that this was done in his presence and in his own hut. (Note: Ubatipa also provided the names of these natives in his deposition to Paredes.) Ubatipa was later able to point out the location where these seven victims were buried. Five of the victims' bones were burned and so deteriorated that their gender could not be determined. The last two bodies were preserved and the commission determined that they belonged to young males, which corroborated Ubatipa's statement.

"The Abyssinia section has also been the theatre of horrific scenes of all kinds of crimes. There the head of that section, Abelardo Agüero, in company with his second Augusto Jiménez, when they want to test marksmanship with firearms, they take out one or more of the Indians that they unjustly have in the stocks and make them leave the house under the pretext of bringing yuccas; once these unfortunate people [are] in the patio of the house receive the volley of rifle fire from theirs murderers in the back. Other times, wanting to improve their aim, they look for children, since their parents have already been murdered, so that they can serve as a smaller target..." (Note: In a similar dialogue, Saldaña elaborates further:"Thus, the elderly Indian men and pubescent Indian girls arrived at the main house in Abisinia, where they were brutally raped. But it was not enough. The machetes whistled and the heads rolled. Neither Agüero nor Jiménez were in favor of Christian burial: they piled up corpses, dying people, heads and limbs, doused them in kerosine and set them on fire.")

— Benjamin Saldaña Rocca, El Proceso del Putumayo y sus secretos

Paredes mentioned that there were four different "burn pits" used to cremate the victims of Jimenez, Agüero and their subordinates at Abisinia. The judge and his commission investigated the first burn pit and found a large quantity of burned human bones that were so deteriorated that the experts on site could not determine the number or the genders of the victims. The other burn pits were in a similar condition. A muchacho de confianza named Bushico Boras provided his testimony to Paredes and reported multiple crimes that were perpetrated by Jimenez and Agüero at Abisinia. Jiménez also shot one of his indigenous concubines out of apparent jealousy.

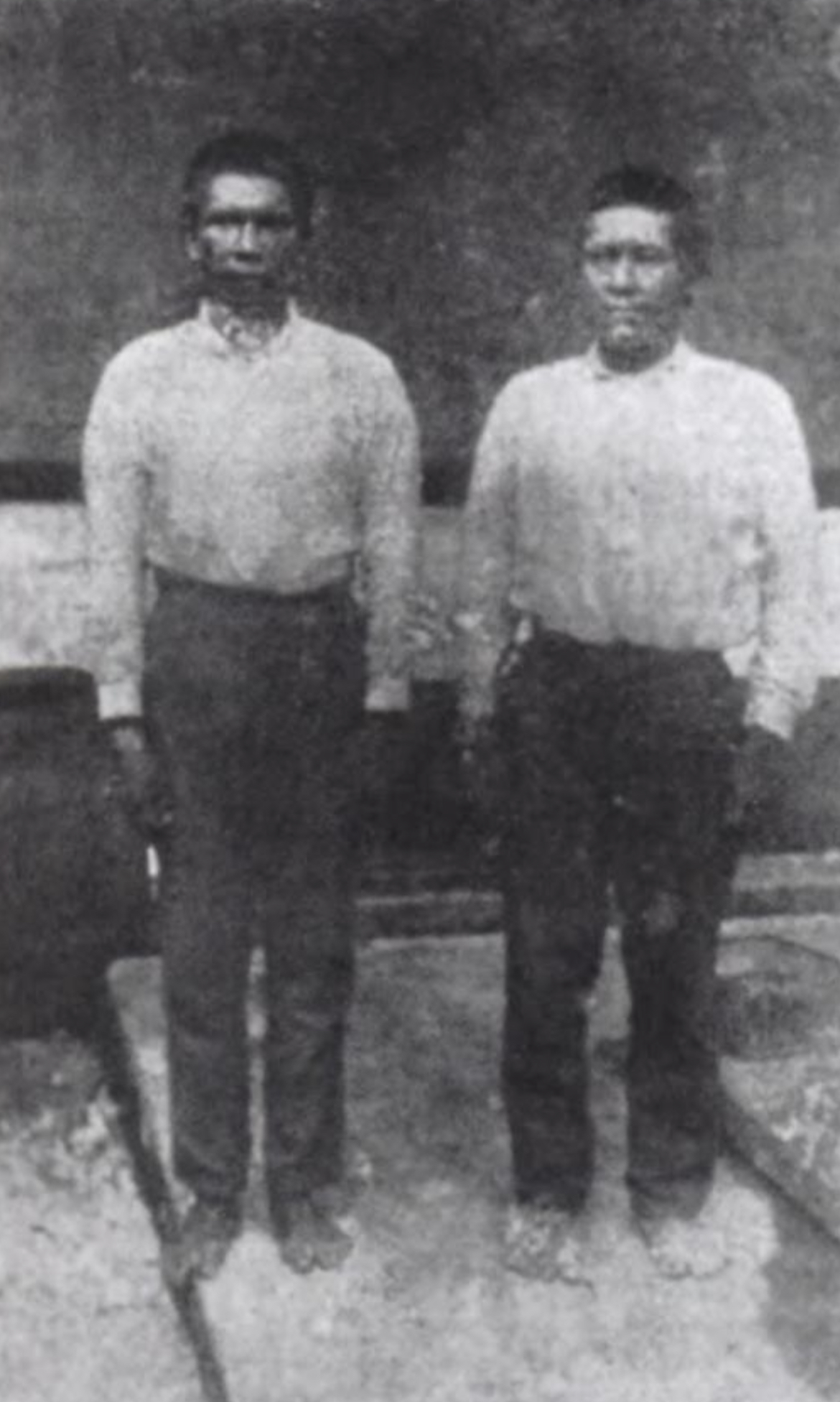
Bushico Boras (left) and Carlos Quinto Nonuya (right), circa 1911.

A Peruvian Amazon Company employee named Isais Ocampo implicated Jimenez with the killing of forty-five natives at Abisinia in one incident through the use of whip and hunger. Ocampo stated that this was because some of them had fled, while the others had delivered what Jiménez deemed to be an unsatisfactory amount of rubber. The natives that extracted and delivered rubber to Abisinia were not provided food by the Peruvian Amazon Company, and many of them died from hunger. (Note: "Jiménez forced the Indians to give him large quantities of rubber and did not give them food..." - Isais Ocampo)

Agustin Pena, another agent of the Peruvian Amazon Company that testified to judge Paredes, declared that one day at Abisinia Jimenez went down into the holding cell and shot one native five times. (Note: This may have been the brother in law of Abisinia's head muchacho de confianza, Jose Maria Boras. Jose stated he did not know the reason for the killing; however, he knew that Jimenez had shot him five times with a revolver.) Pena also declared that while he had witnessed Agüero kill more than sixty natives he believed that Jiménez had perpetrated more murders. The muchacho de confianza Bushico Boras claimed that Jiménez had personally murdered one hundred and thirty-seven natives at Abisinia, and he declared that the Machivare nation disappeared due to Jimenez's actions. PAC employee Ezequiel Zarate estimated that during his employment at Abisinia Jiménez had flogged one hundred natives. (Note: Zarate stated that he had also witnessed Jimenez shoot a child with a revolver while in the hands of its mother.)

=== Morelia ===
==== The Saldaña and Hardenburg depositions ====
On January 5, 1908, a journalist from Iquitos named Benjamin Saldaña Rocca published an article which implicated station managers of the J. C. Arana and Hermanos firm with the perpetration of atrocities against the Putumayo's indigenous population. Saldaña's article was one of the first documents that publicly implicated Jiménez in the Putumayo genocide.

In May 1908 Celestino Lopez stated that he witnessed the flagellation of seven natives occur at Morelia because they did not meet the rubber weight quota. Lopez emphasized that "Two of these victims were mere boys". In his deposition, Lopez referred to Jimenez as "the famous Augusto Jiménez, the author of various violations, arsons, floggings, and homicides." The Barbadian Adolfo Gibbs witnessed a young muchacho de confianza decapitate a thin, sick man that had managed to get out of the cepo and was attempting to run away. Jimenez sent the muchacho to catch this man as well as execute him. The murdered man was an indigenous Bora chief that had previously run away with his people, at the time of his death he had been in chains for three weeks and he had not been fed properly. Gibbs also witnessed the flagellation of two old indigenous women because they were caught pulling sweet potatoes during Jimenez's management of Morelia.

Joao Baptista Braga escaped from Morelia on July 28, 1908, with several natives and three canoes while Jimenez at La Chorrera. (Note: This is the Peruvian day of independence, and Jimenez was celebrating with his coworkers. Braga also escaped with a Colombian prisoner named Felipe Cabrera who later reported several crimes he witnessed Jimenez and Agüero commit.) The Barbadian Stanley Sealy aided Braga in his escape, and prevented another Barbadian named James Chase from intervening. Sealy stated that Jimenez was furious that Braga had gotten away. During that same month in 1908, Jimenez and Victor Macedo beat a Barbadian named Westerman Leavine while at La Chorrera because did not want to stay employed with the company. Braga successfully made his way to Brazil, and gave testimony to several crimes that he had witnessed while in the Putumayo district, including crimes committed by Jimenez and Agüero. His deposition was witnessed and signed by a lieutenant on October 6, 1908.

Braga's testimony was later used by an American engineer in Iquitos named Walter Ernest Hardenburg, who was collecting evidence of crimes perpetrated by the Peruvian Amazon Company. Hardenburg had previously witnessed a massacre carried out by that company, and he was also held as a prisoner on the Liberal steamship. Hardenburg managed to obtain the depositions and evidence collected by Benjamin Saldaña Rocca, which implicated Jiménez and other employees of the Peruvian Amazon Company with genocide.

Hardenburg travelled to England in 1909, and in September he gave his story to a financial watchdog publication named Truth and they began to run a series of articles which would expose the crimes of the Peruvian Amazon Company, and the Putumayo genocide to the English speaking world. Jiménez was mentioned in at least one of the Truth articles. In response to the public reaction towards Hardenburg's information, the British Foreign Office opened a file on the Putumayo atrocities in October 1909, and this would eventually lead to the Foreign Office's decision to attach Consul-General Roger Casement to an investigatory commission to the Putumayo in 1910. Casement's investigation was limited to the conditions of employment Barbadian men employed by the Peruvian Amazon Company were subjected to, and their involvement with the Putumayo atrocities. The Barbadians James Chase, James Mapp, Stanley Sealy, Edward Crichlow, Alfred Hoyte, Reuben Phillips, Joseph Minggs and John Brown reported several crimes perpetrated by Jiménez in their depositions to Cacsement. One of these Barbadians reported an incident where Jimenez told his indigenous wife to kill a man who was imprisoned at Morelia.

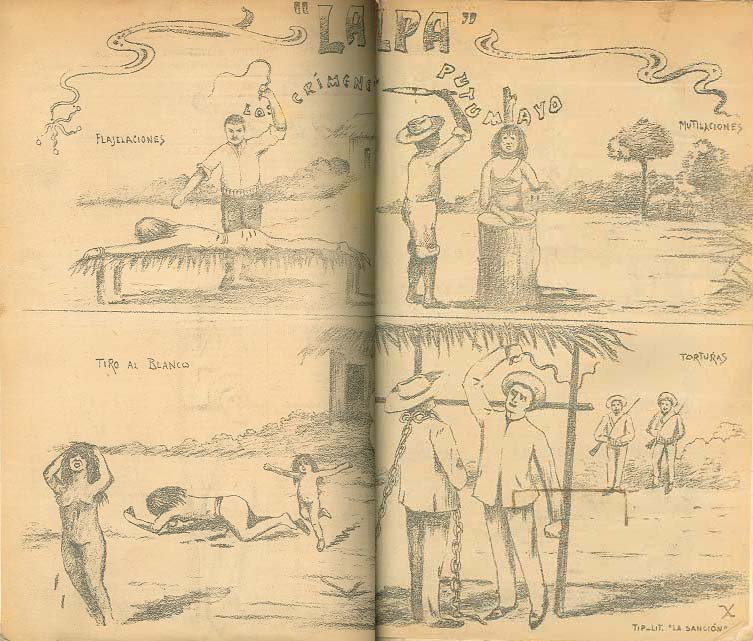
Illustration on the first issue of 'LA FELPA', a newspaper owned by Benjamin Saldaña Rocca.

Sealy and Chase refuted a claim in Braga's testimony which stated that Jimenez had burned a chief named Tiracahuaca alive in July 1908. Sealy stated that Tiracahuaca was alive and that he was actively evading agents of the Peruvian Amazon Company. Tiracahuaca's wife was later beaten to death by Armando Blondel, the subchief of Morelia

An ex-employee of the J.C. Arana y Hermanos firm named Juan Rosa sent his own testimony to Hardenburg on June 6, 1908. Rosa declared that "[o]n the 20th of September I began work at the section Morelia, where Jiménez was the chief, and on the 30th a commission arrived, bringing fifteen Indian prisoners, who were put in stocks. When on the point of dying of hunger, one of the victims told the chief that it would be better to kill them at once and not make them suffer such cruel agonies, whereupon he took a machete, cut off the man's leg, and then ordered him to be dragged away, killed, and burned" Rosa documented another correria led by Jimenez which he stated occurred in 1903, and he declared that there were multiple killings of natives during that incident.

==== Correria of June 1908 ====
At the beginning of a slave raid in June 1908, Jimenez and his group encountered an elderly indigenous woman along a path and they interrogated her. Jimenez's indigenous wife was with him and as she spoke Spanish, she translated for them. Jimenez wanted to know the location of a group of natives that recently escaped the Peruvian Amazon Company's custody, and demanded this knowledge from the elderly woman, who then promised to lead Jimenez to a house. They arrived at the location where the woman stated they would find the house, however there was no house there, so Jimenez had her lifted between two posts, and started a fire under her. She was released from the posts after she suffered from burning, and then a muchacho de confianza decapitated her under Jimenez's orders. Jimenez and his group came across another indigenous woman who had a child, and after the woman stated she did not know where the escaped natives had fled to, Jimenez called her a liar and decapitated her child. Near the banks of the Caqueta the group came across a young indigenous man, who Jimenez had raised onto posts before lighting a fire under him since the man did not tell Jimenez where he could find a boat. After a certain period of time Jimenez ordered the muchacho José María to shoot this native man who was still burning. (Note: In his 1911 deposition, José María admitted that he perpetrated this crime on behalf of Jiménez's orders so that they could extract information from the young indigenous man. José María clarified that he did not know this man's name since they were not from the same nation.) The deposition of Barbadian James Mapp contained information regarding a massacre that occurred near the rubber station of Morelia after a correria led by Jiménez in January 1906. (Note: The Amazon Journal of Roger Casement describes the practice of correrias as "[p]remediated attacks on tribal communities in order to enslave.") Jimenez's expedition had captured several people in the forest and on the way back to Abisinia they decided to stay at an indigenous settlement. Mapp stated that he heard a large native drum called a manguaré, issuing a signal, which a muchacho named Jose Maria interpreted as Andoque people calling for Boras reinforcements in order to attack the slave raiding group. Jimenez ordered the thirty native men and women his group had captured to be taken out of the cepo they were incarcerated in, and then killed. Mapp declared that this occurred in Bora territory, six hours away from Morelia. In his deposition, Mapp stated that "[t]hese people were killed not because Jimenez was frightened and wanted to run away, but only because the 'manguaré' was beating and calling the Indians-only for that reason."

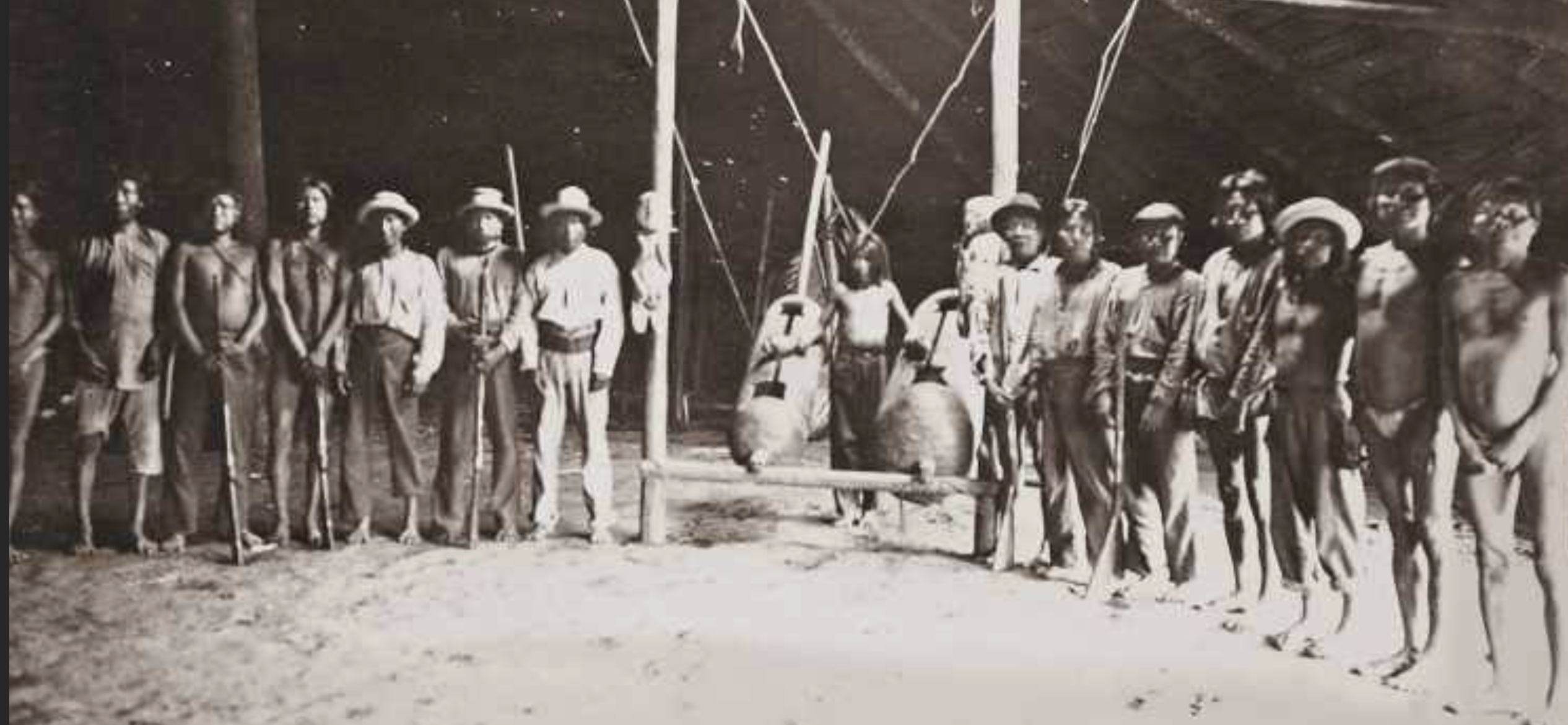
Photograph of indigenous people at the Entre Rios Station, circa 1911. A manguare can be seen in the center.

The Barbadian John Brown had relayed information about this incident to Captain Thomas Whiffen in 1908, prior to Casement's investigation, and he also corroborated Mapp's information. Mapp stated that Brown's information was correct except for the facts that only one native was burned during that incident, the group did not run away after the massacre as stated in Brown's story, and that it was a muchacho de confianza who interpreted the signals for Jimenez and not a captive like Brown reported. Brown's information was one of the first reports of crime in the Putumayo that reached the British Foreign Office, and helped to shed light on the situation. (Note: Brown later stated that the information relayed by Mapp was factual, and that he, Brown, was reporting information to Whiffen based on his own memory.) Brown stated that he had seen Jimenez kill many natives prior to his departure from Abisinia in 1907. At Morelia, he witnessed Jiménez execute twelve natives, males and females, because they had previously "run away and were bad and were not wanted again." Brown had also reported an incident where Jimenez and Agüero had a shooting competition aimed at an indigenous chief's genitals. Mapp was not a witness to this crime however he had heard many of the other Barbadians talk about it.

==== Paredes's investigation of Morelia ====
Two muchachos de confianzas, Dubago Boras and Jose Maria Boras later testified to judge Paredes information regarding this raid, and they corroborated Mapp's information. Jose Maria explained that the bodies of the victims were burned. In his deposition to judge Rómulo Paredes, Jose Maria declared that Jimenez interpreted the use of the manguaré drum as a sign that the indigenous people nearby would try to kill him. Jose Maria claimed that Jimenez stated "before they kill me, we are going to kill them". (Note: The original quote in Spanish is "antes que me maten vamos a matarlos") Dubago Boras stated Jiménez led a correria towards the Pamá River in order to find a group of natives that Jiménez declared had wanted him dead. Jiménez's group descended upon a hut that was inhabited by forty natives which were dancing at the time, and these natives were killed by bullets and machetes.

A Colombian named Simón Muñoz testified to judge Paredes and stated that José María had killed many natives under the orders of Jiménez and Agüero. María acted as an interpreter on these raids, and he later gave a testimony to judge Paredes. He confessed to killing multiple people under the orders of Jimenez and Agüero, including the incident where he was ordered to shoot the native man who was burning. A muchacho de confianza found a boat shortly after which Jimenez used to cross the river with a portion of his group, excluding the Barbadian men. Six days later Jimenez and this group returned with three canoes, and fifty captured natives which were taken back to Morelia as prisoners. The Barbadians Stanley Sealy and James Chase were on this slave raid and reported this incident in their depositions to Casement. (Note: Joseph Minggs did not witness the killings however he did see the native corpses. Alfred Hoyte was also on this raid, and corroborated Sealy and Chase's statements.)

Casement believed that "[n]othing in the Hardenburg book exceeds in horror the account given by the two Barbados men of Jimenez burning alive the old Boras woman and the young Boras man in June 1908...". Sealy stated that these natives received rice and beans, and that he was not a witness to further brutal-treatment of this group. "They were to be kept in confinement until they became 'tamed' and agreed to work rubber." When Roger Casement interviewed Sealy in 1910 and questioned why he did not report these crimes to Macedo, Sealy stated it was because Macedo was already aware. (Note: "he had believed Señor Macedo knew all about the wrong things done, and there was no use telling him.”) Another Colombian implicated in the Putumayo genocide, named Aquileo Torres agreed to enter the Peruvian Amazon Company's service, and he accompanied Jimenez and this group on the commission across the Caqueta in June 1908. (Note: Casement stated that this may have been the beginning of Torres' employment with the PAC. Celestino Lopez stated in his deposition that Torres was still a prisoner at the time of his departure from Abisinia in May of 1908.) (Note: "In May of 1908 he had been dispatched from La Chorrera to Abisinia to assist Agüero and Jimenez in the terrorisation of the Boras Indians.")

Another testimony from a Colombian named Juan Villota may recount 1908 correria, however, Villota did not provide many details in his deposition. Villota stated that he was on a raid with Jiménez near the banks of the Cahuinari River and they found twenty-nine natives at a hut. These natives were massacred by machetes after they were tied up. Jose Maria also reported that he had accompanied Jiménez on a separate raid which claimed the lives of fifty natives. The deposition of Isais Ocampo to judge Paredes claimed that the "bones of Jiménez's victims cover the road that leads from Abyssinia to the Morelia section."

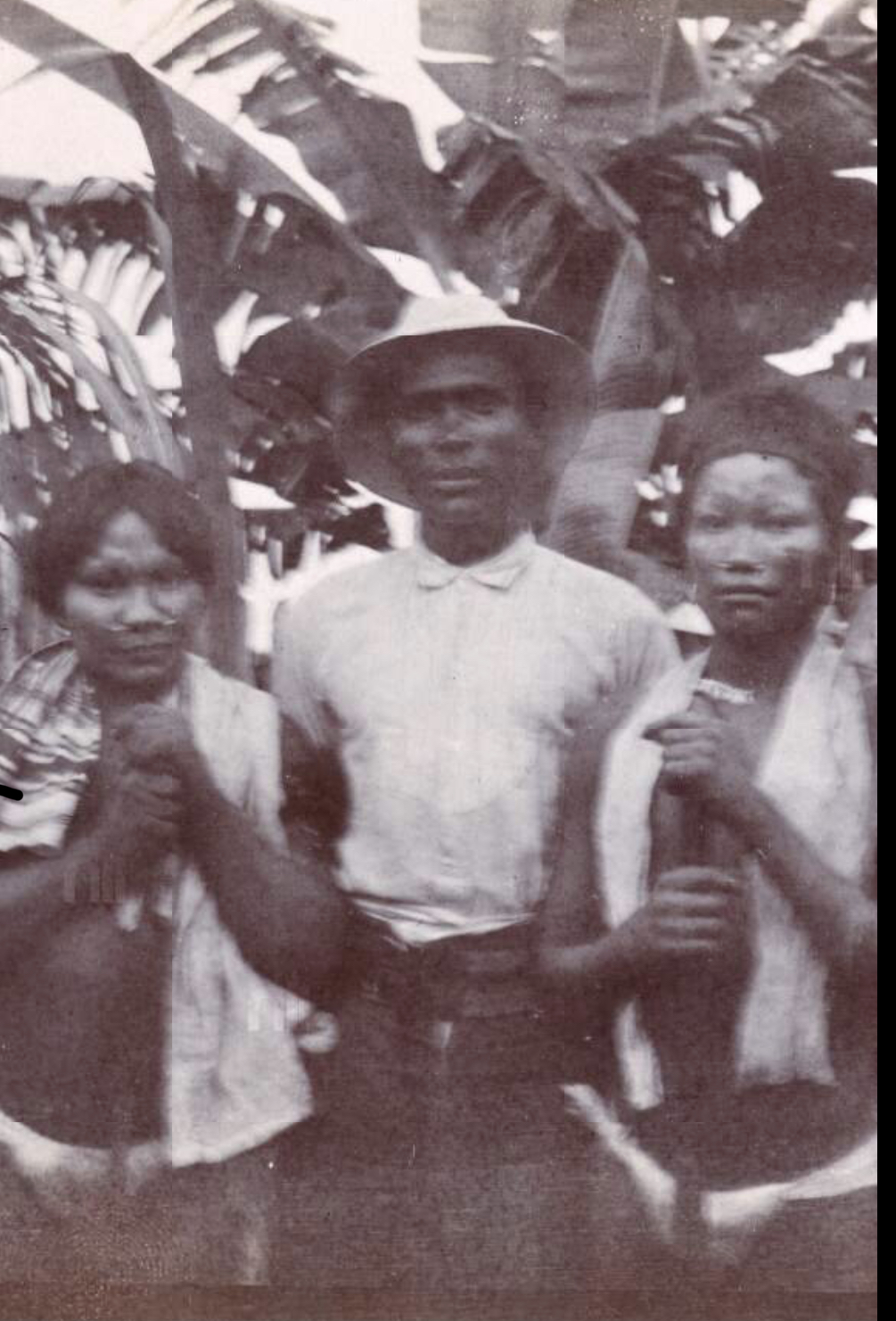
Stanley Sealy standing next to two Putumayo natives for comparison, circa 1910.

In his deposition, Isais Ocampo declared to Paredes that Jiménez had around one hundred natives from the Morelia section executed because they he was not satisfied with the amount of rubber they had brought in for the collection period. Ocampo noted that Jiménez was aided by his subordinates and muchachos de confianza during this massacre. An employee named Rodolfo Rodriguez may have recounted the same incident in his testimony to Paredes, and Rodriguez stated that over one hundred natives were killed through whips and hunger under the orders of Agüero. (Note: Rodolfo Rodriguez was also implicated in the Putumayo genocide, and had an arrest warrant issued against him in 1911.) This was done because of a dispute between Agüero and Armando Normand over who had the rights to possess these indigenous workers. Since there was no agreement on the matter, Agüero decided to have this group killed. This incident later became a factor in the rebellion of Katenere, a Bora chief.

Katenere was initially working for Normand before he fled with his people. This group was captured and interred at the cepo of Abisinia. While Katenere was imprisoned, Bartolome Zumaeta raped Katenere's wife in front of him, and this became another reason for Katenere rebelling. Zumaeta had joined Agüero and Jimenez in their raids against the Boras natives after he was forced to flee from El Encanto's agency due several crimes he committed in that area. Jiménez's involvement in suppressing this rebellion is not well documented, however there were numerous raids sent from Abisinia and Morelia to capture Katenere after he killed Zumaeta in May 1909. (Note: Katenere was later shot and killed by a muchacho de confianza at Abisinia while he was trying to communicate with his wife, who was recently captured.)

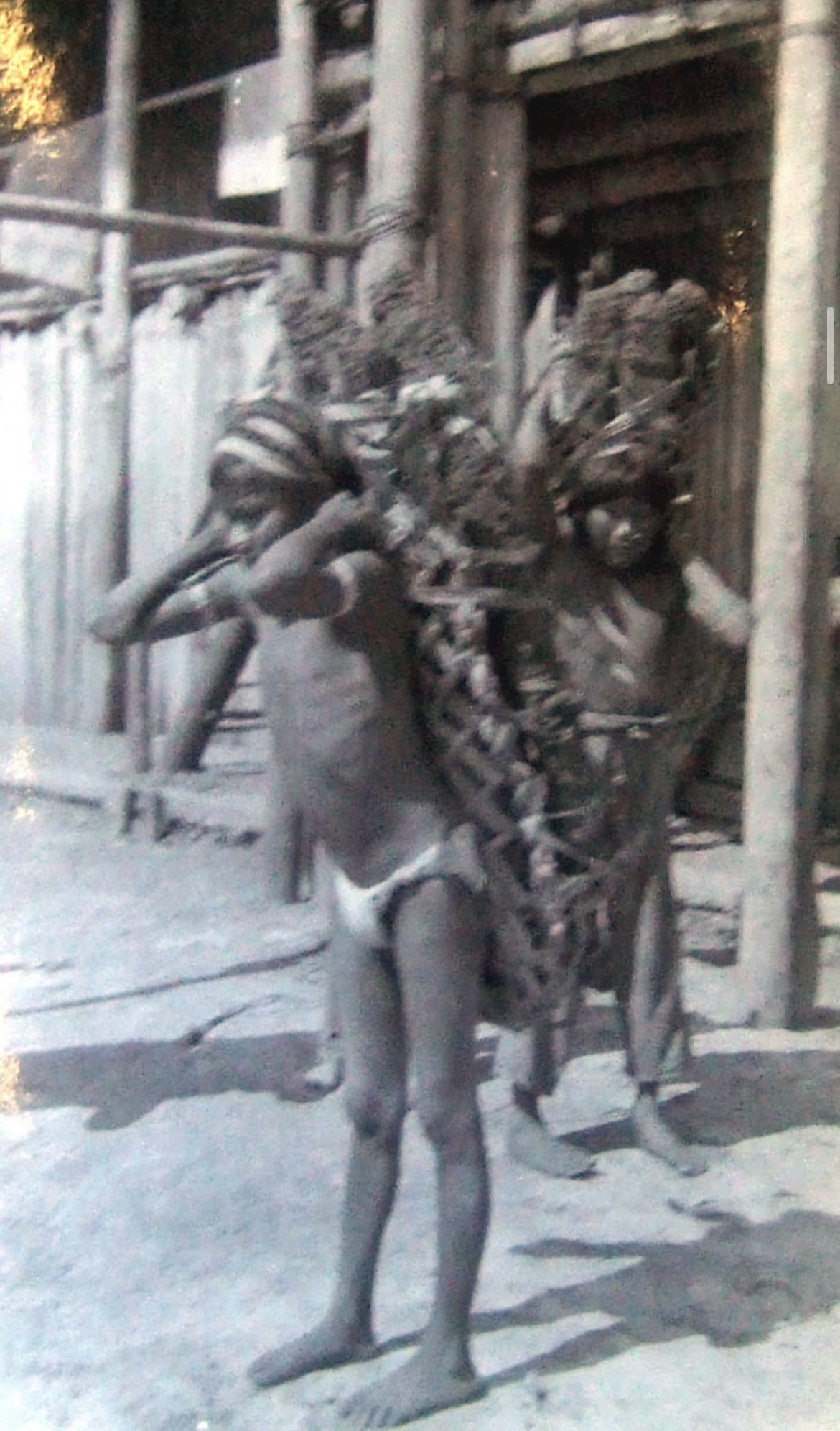
An indigenous youth carrying a load of rubber at another station (Note: Entre Rios, station of Andrés O'Donnell) of La Chorrera's agency, circa 1910.

Jimenez was later transferred to Ultimo Retiro and appointed as the rubber station's manager. Another Peruvian Amazon Company employee implicated in the Putumayo genocide named Armando Blondel assumed leadership over Morelia after Jimenez left. According to Evelyn Batson's statement to Casement, Blondel was managing Morelia as early as June 1909. At the time, there were only ten natives working rubber for the station, the other natives had run away. This term of management may have occurred while Jiménez was on an expedition to hunt down a group of natives. There was a payment issued on October 12 of 1909 for Jiménez spending four days searching for natives. The payment, which was recorded in a ledger at La Chorrera, was later used as evidence of the Peruvian Amazon Company engaging in the slave trade. (Note: This payment was listed under a section titled "The recapture of fugitive indians".)

=== Ultimo Retiro ===
During Casement's investigation at Ultimo Retiro, one man, in the presence of Casement and Jimenez, had declared that in the previous year, during Montt's management, many natives had been either flogged or starved to death in the cepo at Ultimo Retiro. While passing the Meretas nation near Ultimo Retiro, Crichlow mentioned that "[t]his section used to have plenty of Indians - they've been killed mostly". Ovidio Lagos, Arana's biographer, noted that the first description of a rubber center in Casement's 1910 journal was based on Ultimo Retiro, which Lagos referred to as "an extermination center" under the management of Jiménez.

Jimenez approached Edward Crichlow before and after his interview with Casement on October 8, Jimenez stated claimed the company would cover Crichlow's debts and increase his pay if he did not report anything else to Casement. (Note: At the time, Crichlow had an outstanding debt of at least 120 Peruvian soles.) Jimenez also offered Crichlow an additional 20 Peruvian soles. In his interview, Circhlow declared that while he had not seen natives flogged at Ultimo Retiro during his employment there, he stated natives "were sometimes confined in the stocks by Señor Jiménez, but not for any length of time."

==== The 1910 correria across the Caqueta ====
Crichlow mentioned a company "commission" led by Jiménez into the Caqueta, which would have been an invasion of Colombia. Crichlow stated that the correria left Ultimo Retiro on the March 7, 1910 and this commission arrived at the banks of the Caqueta on March 22 in pursuit of natives that ran away from Entre Rios. Twenty one natives and three Colombians were captured by Jiménez's group. Casement later found out the raid was ordered by Victor Macedo, La Chorrera's general manager. Macedo had also offered a monetary bonus to the members of this group that Jiménez believed had performed satisfactory during the raid.

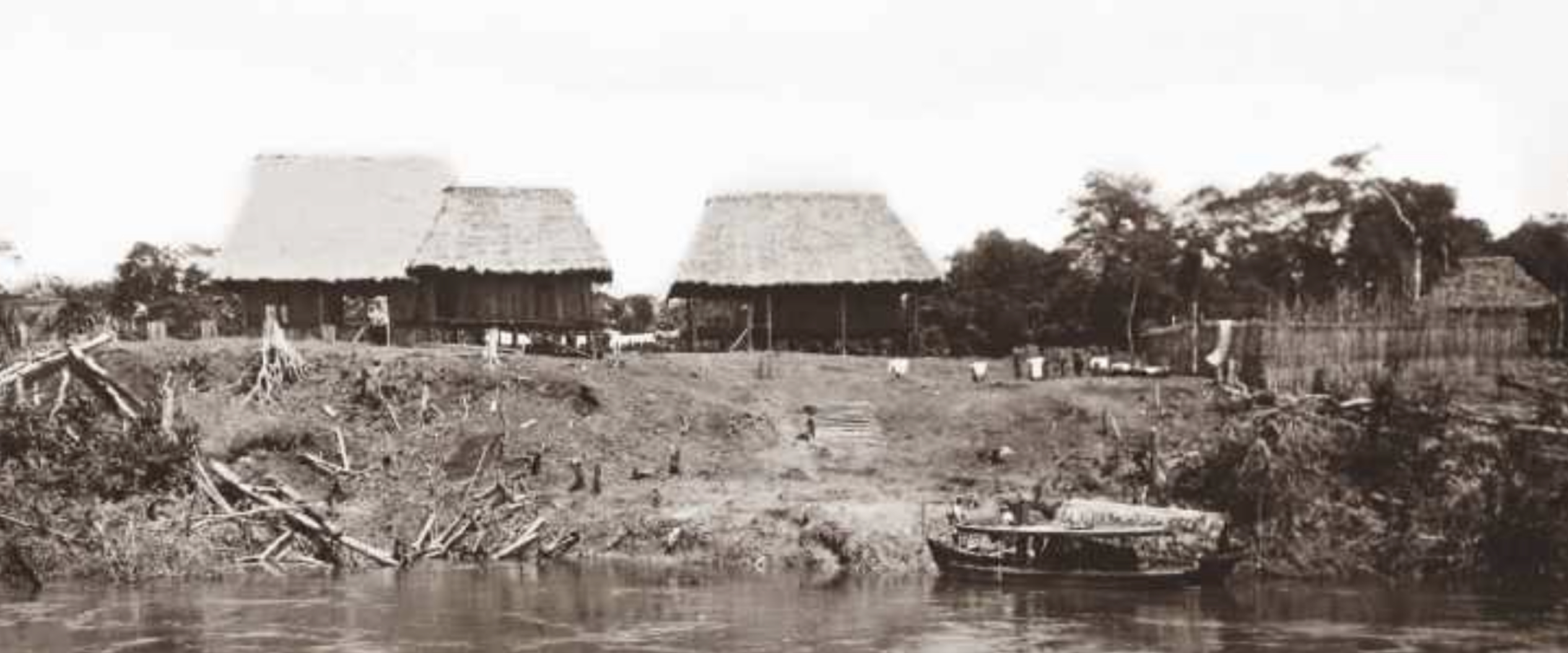
General view of Ultimo Retiro, circa 1911.

Crichlow initially claimed that no one was killed during the 1910 commission, however a Peruvian named Pinedo testified to Casement that Aquiléo Torres had killed a native boy in front of Jimenez and the rest of the group. Pinedo also stated that Torres "had also killed two women, for sheer brutality sport – all this quite recently." A Barbadian named Reuben Philips was also a part of this correria, he provided a statement to Casement which corroborated Pinedo's claims. Jimenez later had Torres transferred away from Ultimo Retiro and sent to Occidente. (Note: La Chorrera's agency later sent Torres to Abisinia, "where the commission of crime is easiest and most recurrent.") (Note: In the written account of Pinedo's interview with Casement, Pinedo claimed that in regards to Torres, "Jiménez had kicked him out from Ultimo Retiro as impossible. (the word he used, botar, means about that)..." After Tizon interviewed Pinedo separately, he "informed Casement that Aquiléo Torres had been sent away from Ultimo Retiro by Jiménez as 'being too much for Jiménez,' and as a punishment, or for some other reason, had been sent to Abisinia.")

On November 8, Casement received two letters from Crichlow, he begged Casement to make an arrangement with the company so that he could leave the Putumayo with Casement because he believed his life was in danger at Ultimo Retiro. Crichlow later admitted to Casement that he lied in regards to nobody being killed during the correria across the Caqueta. He also informed Casement that he was offered a bribe by Jiménez and Victor Macedo to conceal information from Casement and that Pinedo's statement was true. (Note: At the time, Crichlow had an outstanding debt of £24. The bribe offered to Crichlow was that the company would nullify his debt if he lied to Casement.)

==== Interview with Casement ====
Jiménez approached Roger Casement at La Chorrera on November 14, 1910, for an interview in what Casement viewed as an attempt to get a statement "that would have whitewashed him" from Braga's accusations. Jiménez had learned through the translator he brought to the interview that he was incriminated in the Truth articles through Braga's information. (Note: After the interview, this translator told Casement that each of the Peruvian Amazon Company managers had flogged natives, and they were lying if they claimed otherwise.) Casement declared that he had no say in Jiménez's own affairs between the Truth charges and the Government of Peru, and he also stated that Jiménez should pursue a libel case if he felt that he was wronged. Casement later wrote "[h]e begged me to listen to his statement, and said he could prove that one of the charges against him in Truth was not true. On the other hand, the evidence against him is overwhelming."

Casement included part of a conversation he had with Juan A. Tizon in his 1910 journal, and quoting Tizon, Casement wrote "Jimenez said they were good people and if properly dealt with would be far more useful – but they had been outraged beyond words. Jimenez he says is a humble man. He did what he was got to do – because he is (a cholo) obedient and will obey good orders when they are given him." At the time, Tizon was the Peruvian Amazon Company chief representative at La Chorrera.

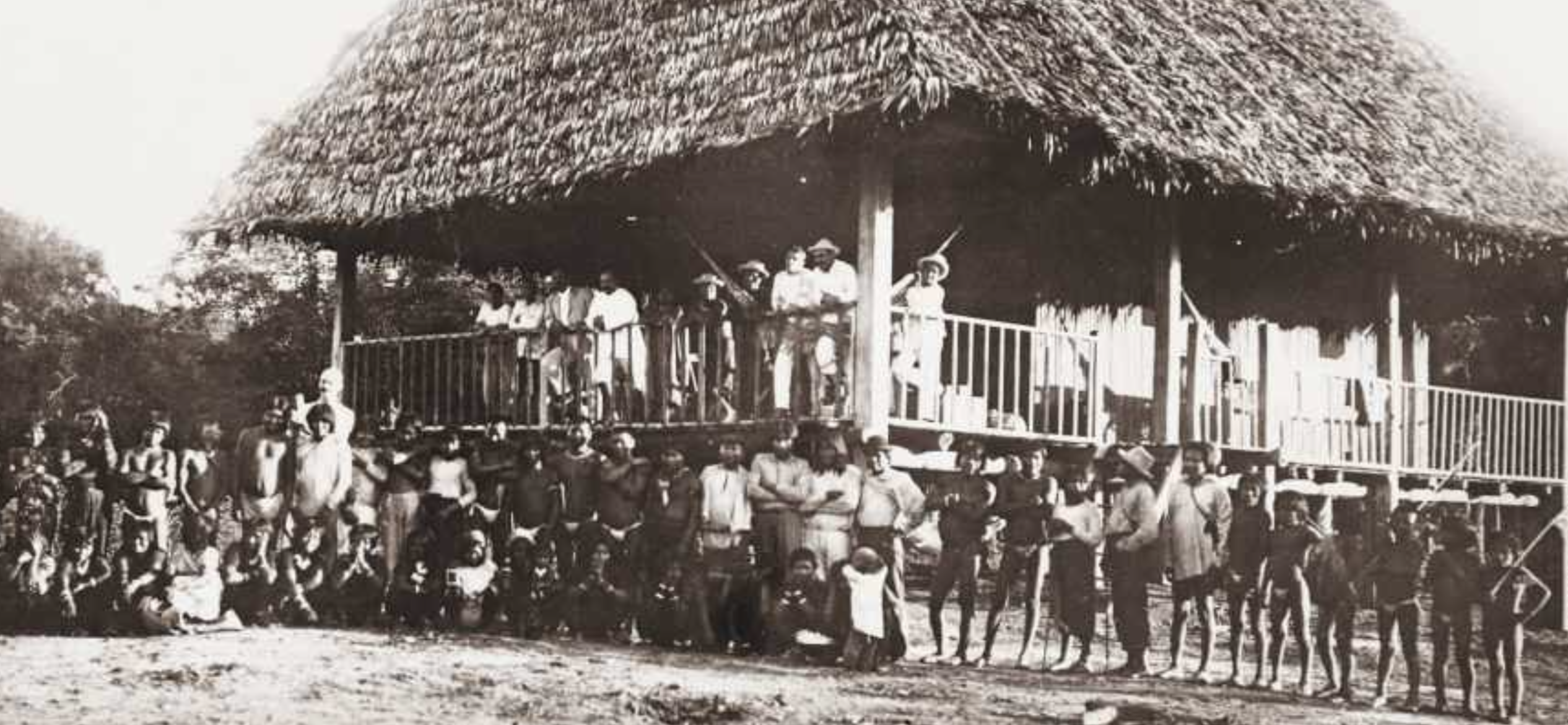
Photograph taken at the Ultimo Retiro station, circa 1911

==== Dismissal from the Peruvian Amazon Company ====
Judge Paredes believed that Jiménez and Agüero were pressured into leaving the Peruvian Amazon Company due to Tizon's influence. Paredes wrote "I can certify that the last who left Abisinia – Agüero and Jimenez – did so because of the attitude of the said manager. These repugnant fiends, as if still attracted by the blood of their victims, were the last to abandon the gruesome scenes, leaving behind a record of more than a hundred murders."

Tizon dismissed Jimenez along with Normand, Agüero, Fonseca, Montt, and Velarde. Jimenez and Agüero were aboard the Liberal when judge Paredes was returning to La Chorrera upon the completion of his investigation, and he was the last source to mention Jimenez and Agüero together until 1913. One rumor stated that Jiménez fled to Callao. Casement heard another rumor that Jiménez had made his way to Lima and then boarded a Booth steamship destined for New York. Prior to his departure from the Putumayo, Agüero had several of the native crop fields around Abisinia burned in an attempt to rouse the Boras natives into rebellion.

== Later life ==
On June 27, 1911, Paredes issued an arrest warrant for Jiménez and over two hundred other Peruvian Amazon Company employees, including Agüero. (Note: Paredes returned from his investigation on the Putumayo with over 1,300 pages of information including evidence of crimes and atrocities in the region.) Judge Carlos Valcárcel later issued an arrest warrant against La Chorrera's general manager and the boss of Jiménez, Victor Macedo. On June 27, 1912, an extradition order against Jimenez and another station manager named Andrés O'Donnell was issued.

In 1914, The Anti-Slavery Reporter and Aborigines' Friend published an article titled "The Putumayo Rubber Slavery", which contained details regarding “the whereabouts of the three of the most notorious criminals of the Putumayo." (Note: This article was based on information relayed by a Colombian consul-general to George Mitchell, a British consul general.) The article noted that in a consular dispatch dated October 17, 1913, the British consul-general at Manaus was informed that Abelardo Agüero, Victor Macedo and Augusto Jiménez were tenants of the Suárez Hermanos rubber firm in Bolivia. Jiménez and Macedo were located at Cobija Bolivia, while Agüero was on a Suárez estate known as Chapacura. The author of the consular dispatch cited allegations which claimed that every four months Agüero "sends a young woman" to Jiménez. In a separate article titled "The Putumayo Criminals", Agüero and Jiménez were reported as being on the Orton River, near Riberalta "where they are exploiting Indians and others under the name of Cavero and Co." Cavero & Co. was financially supported by Francisco Suárez and agents of the Suárez Hermanos firm aided the company. The author of the article claimed that the pair had no less than thirty five Huitoto people with them, consisting of men, women and children.

In April 1914, Jiménez was captured along with Agüero, at the time, they were both working on a rubber producing estate belonging to Nicolás Suárez Callaú in Beni, Bolivia. The Bolivian minister that reported their arrest stated Macedo had left the area before these arrest were made. (Note: "Victor Macedo, it appears, had previously left the Bolivian territory.) The Peruvian supreme court of justice requested the extradition of Jimenez, Agüero and Macedo from Bolivia after they received news about the arrests. Jiménez and Agüero were both sent to the prefecture of Madre de Dios, where they escaped on September 24, 1914 at 5:20 in the morning along with two other criminals from the Putumayo. (Note: The Peruvian Supreme court of Justice's information from 1917 stated that Jiménez escaped, while Agüero was sent to Lima at the end of February. Their information does not specify if Agüero also escaped for a short period of time in September. The two aforementioned criminals that were Sául Seminario and Manuel Vela. Sául was captured shortly after his escape from incarceration.) There were shots fired and one guard was killed during the escape. Jiménez was never captured again, however Agüero was recaptured on a later date and sent to Guadalupe Prison in Lima at the end of February in 1915. (Note: Armando Normand escaped from that prison in 1915 "with other henchmen of Arana to Brazil" however Agüero was not a part of this group.) Agüero remained there until at least June 17 of 1916, when he issued a writ of Habeas corpus that eventually led to his release. An official document from the prefecture of Madre de Dios published in 1916 listed two Peruvian patrons, referred to as Jimenez and Agüero on the Tahuamanu River and the document stated they had 18 Huitoto families with them. Jiménez also sent a local Prefect named Emilio Delboy a map of the Acre River around this time.

While searching for information regarding Jiménez, Paredes Pando interviewed a man referred to as Don Alberto. (Note: Paredes Pando discovered the grave of Alberto Jiménez while investigating evidence that Augusto Jiménez fled towards the border of Brazil and Bolivia as a means of seeking refuge from law enforcement.) Alberto stated that there was a man at Puerto Carlos named Augusto Seminario, who was feared by the local population because they believed he was a murderer. Alberto described one incident, where there were two boats passing each other and Augusto was on one of these boats. Augusto challenged the owner of the other boat, who was travelling with a native woman, and Augusto asked how could he travel with an indigenous female. After asking that question, Augusto shot the woman in the head. The grave of Alberto Jiménez Seminario which contained the words [l]eaving his brother Augusto inconsolable" was used as supporting evidence by Peruvian anthropologist Oscar Paredes Pando that Augusto Jiménez had stayed around the Brazilian border as late as 1919. Paredes Pando emphasized that this proximity to the border ensured that whenever authorities pursued Jiménez, he could flee towards Brazil where he would not be extradited. According to the oral testimony of Don Alberto documented by Paredes Pando, during World War I, there was an English captain sent to the Acre River basin on a special mission from an Indian Defense Committee with orders to arrest Jiménez for murdering indigenous people. This captain managed to find Jimenez and his brother Alberto however they both escaped to a border town named San Lorenzo, and several police officers were killed during this incident. Jimenez later accused this captain of being a fascist, a traitor to his country and of working with the Germans. This pursuit of Jiménez ended after these accusations.

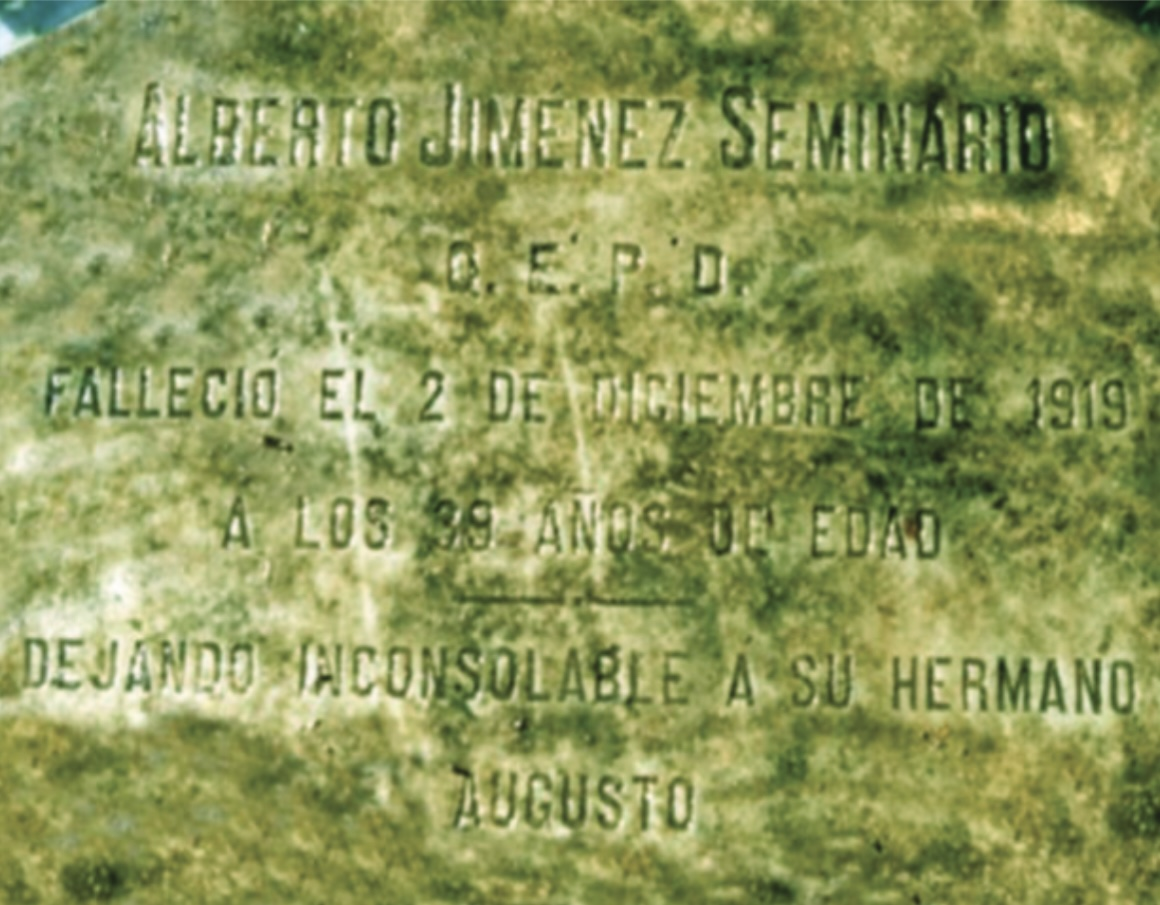
Grave of Alberto Jiménez: “He died on December 2, 1919 at the age of 39. Leaving his brother Augusto inconsolable.“

In 1924, Jiménez published an anthropological paper on the Boras people of the Putumayo containing eleven pages of information based on some of the knowledge he obtained in the Putumayo. This paper was later translated into German by Konrad Theodor Preuss. The intermediary that sent Theodor this paper noted that Jiménez was an educated Peruvian that lived among the Putumayo's indigenous people for seven years, and that Jiménez was "considered a good observer, which is why he believes that his notes will generally correspond to reality." Theodor noted that prior to Jiménez's paper, Thomas Whiffen was the "only person to have written something about the Boro".

In 1929, a document published by the Peruvian ministry of House and Commerce listed an "Augusto Jiménez S." as a custom agent on the Tahuamanu River. Jiménez published another paper based on the Bora people in 1933, titled Breve estudio sobre la tribu» Bora» de la comarca de los tíos Putumayo y Caquetá in Revista Universitaria. A document from the Sociedad Geográfica de Lima published in 1938 mentioned that Jiménez, using his full name, was a member of a departmental geographic society however the document does not clarify which department in Peru. The circumstances and date of his death are not public knowledge.
