= Muinane language =

Language spoken in Colombia

Muinane
- Muìnánɨ
- Native to: Colombia
- Region: Puerto Santander, Amazonas; between Caquetá River and Yari River in Caquetá Department
- Ethnicity: 2,100 (2018)
- Native speakers: 150 (2007)
- Language family: ?Bora–Witoto: Boran; Muinane

Language codes
- ISO 639-3: bmr
- Glottolog: muin1242
- ELP: Muinane
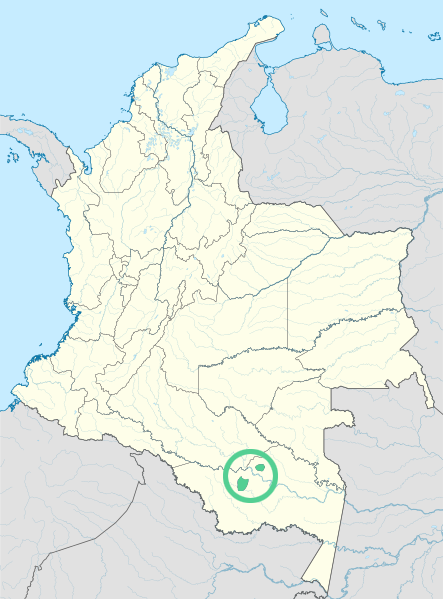

Muinane is an indigenous American language spoken in Colombia.

== Classification ==
Muinane belongs to the Boran language family, along with Bora.

== Geographic distribution ==
Muinane is spoken by 150 people in Colombia along the Upper Cahuinarí River in the Department of Amazonas. There may be some speakers in Peru.

== Phonology ==
=== Consonants ===
Muinane consonant phonemes
	Bilabial	Alveolar	Postalveolar/ Palatal	Velar	Glottal
Nasal	m	n	ɲ		
Plosive	p b	t d	tʲ dʲ	k ɡ	ʔ
Affricate			tʃ dʒ		
Fricative	ɸ β	s	ʃ j	x	
Trill		r	rʲ		

- Voiceless stops and affricates contrast with their geminate counterparts: tː tʃː tʲː kː.

=== Vowels ===
Muinane vowel phonemes
	Front	Central	Back
High	i	ɨ	u
Low	ɛ	a	o

=== Tone ===
There are two tones in Muinane: high and low.

== Writing system ==
Muinane is written using a Latin alphabet. A chart of symbols with the sounds they represent is as follows:

Latin	IPA	Latin	IPA	Latin	IPA	Latin	IPA	Latin	IPA	Latin	IPA
a	/a/	b	/b/	c	/k/-/s/	ch	/tʃ/	d	/d/	e	/e/
f	/ɸ/	g(u)	/ɡ/-/x/	h	/ʔ/	i	/i/	ɨ	/ɨ/	j	/x/
ll	/dʒ/	m	/m/	n	/n/	ñ	/ɲ/	o	/o/	p	/p/
qu	/k/	r	/r/	z	/s/	s	/ʃ/	t	/t/	u	/u/
v	/β/	y	/j/								

- Palatalized consonants are written using the unpalatalized forms plus y: ty /tʲ/, dy /dʲ/, ry /rʲ/. For the purposes of alphabetization, these are considered sequences of letters.
- Tone is not generally indicated in writing. When it is shown, it is indicated by an acute accent over the vowel: á, é, í, ɨ́, ó, ú.
- The Muinane writing system is based on Spanish orthography. For that reason, the sound /k/ is written as c before a, ɨ, o, and u and as qu before e and i. Likewise, the sound /ɡ/ is written as gu before e and i, and g elsewhere.

== Grammar ==
Word order in Muinane is generally SOV. Case marking is nominative–accusative.

== Sources ==
- Aschmann, Richard P. (1993), Proto-Witotoan, Arlington, TX: SIL International, ISBN 0-88312-189-1
- Walton, James W.; Walton, Janice P. (1967), "Phonemes of Muinane", in Waterhouse, Viola G. (ed.), Phonemic systems of Colombian languages, Norman, OK: SIL International, pp. 37–47
- Walton, James P.; Walton, Janice W.; Pakky de Buenaventure, Clementina (1997), Diccionario Bilingüe Muinane-Español/Español-Muinane, Santafé de Bogotá: Editorial Buena Semilla, OCLC 468683910
