= Bora people =

Indigenous tribe of South America

Bora
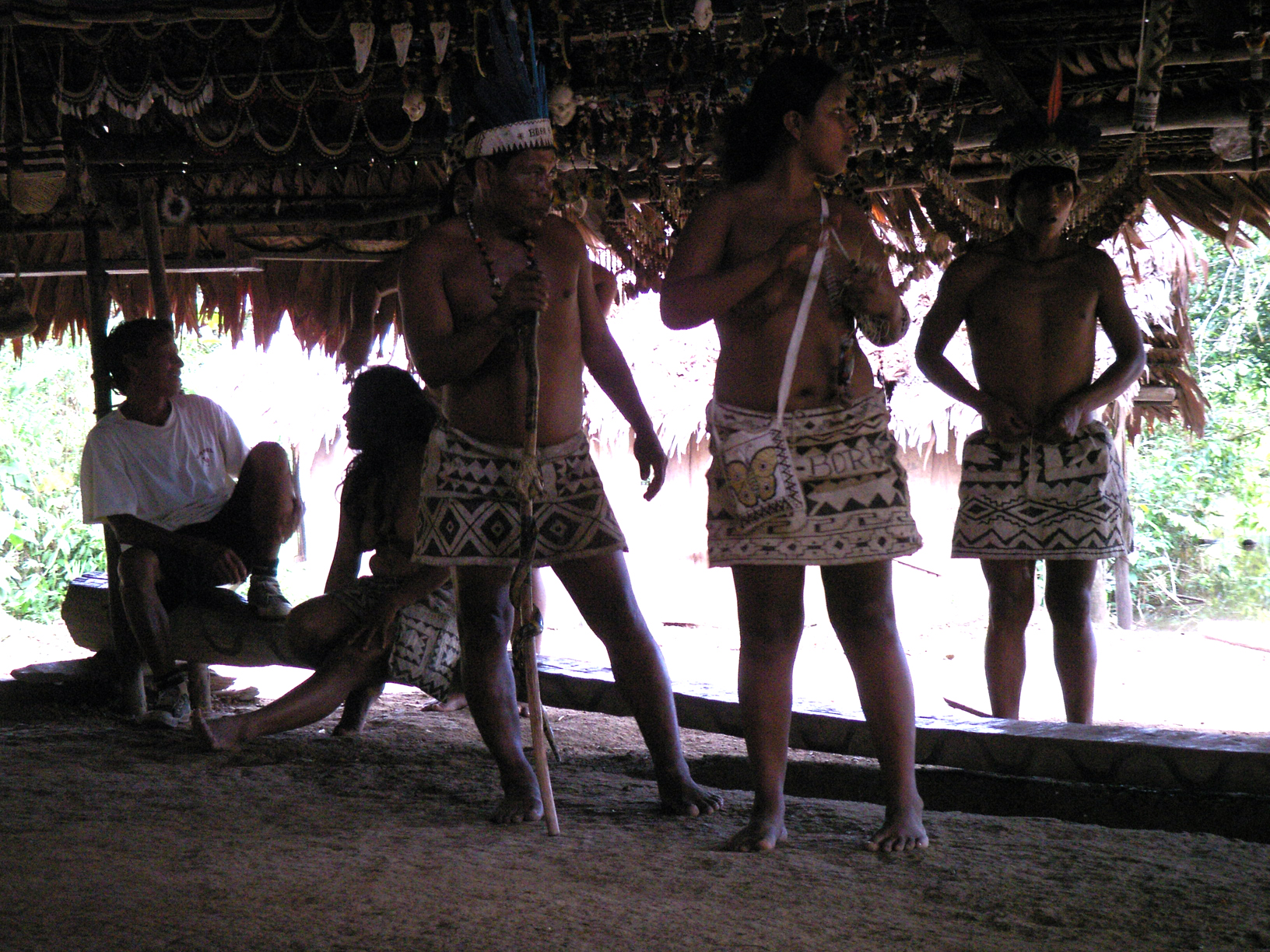

Total population
- Approx. 2,000 (various post-2001 est.)

Regions with significant populations
- Peru; Colombia; Brazil

Languages
- Bora, Spanish

Religion
- Christian, Animist

Related ethnic groups
- Witoto, Ocaina

The Bora are an Indigenous tribe of the Peruvian, Colombian, and Brazilian Amazon, located between the Napo, Putumayo and Caqueta rivers.

== Ethnography ==
The Bora comprise approximately 2,000 people and speak the Bora language, a member of the proposed Bora–Witoto language family.

In the last forty years, the Bora have become a largely settled people living mostly in permanent forest settlements.

The animist Bora worldview makes no distinction between the physical and spiritual worlds, and spirits are considered to be present throughout the world.

Bora families practice exogamy.

The Bora have an elaborate knowledge of the plant life of the surrounding rainforest. Like other indigenous peoples of the Peruvian Amazon, such as the Urarina, plants, especially trees, hold a complex and important interest for the Bora.

Bows and arrows are the main weapons of the Bora culture used in person to person conflict.

The Bora have guarded their lands from both indigenous foes and outsider colonials. Around the time of the 20th century, the rubber boom and Putumayo genocide had a devastating impact on the Boras, which suffered enslavement, physical abuse, and other detriments to their population. An unknown number of Bora people fled across the Caqueta River during this time period. Hundreds of Boras were enslaved at rubber stations belonging to Julio César Arana's rubber company, specifically the stations of Entre Rios, La Sabana, Santa Catalina and Abisinia.

The Bora tribe's ancestral lands are currently threatened by illegal logging practices. The Bora have no indigenous reserves.

== Gallery ==
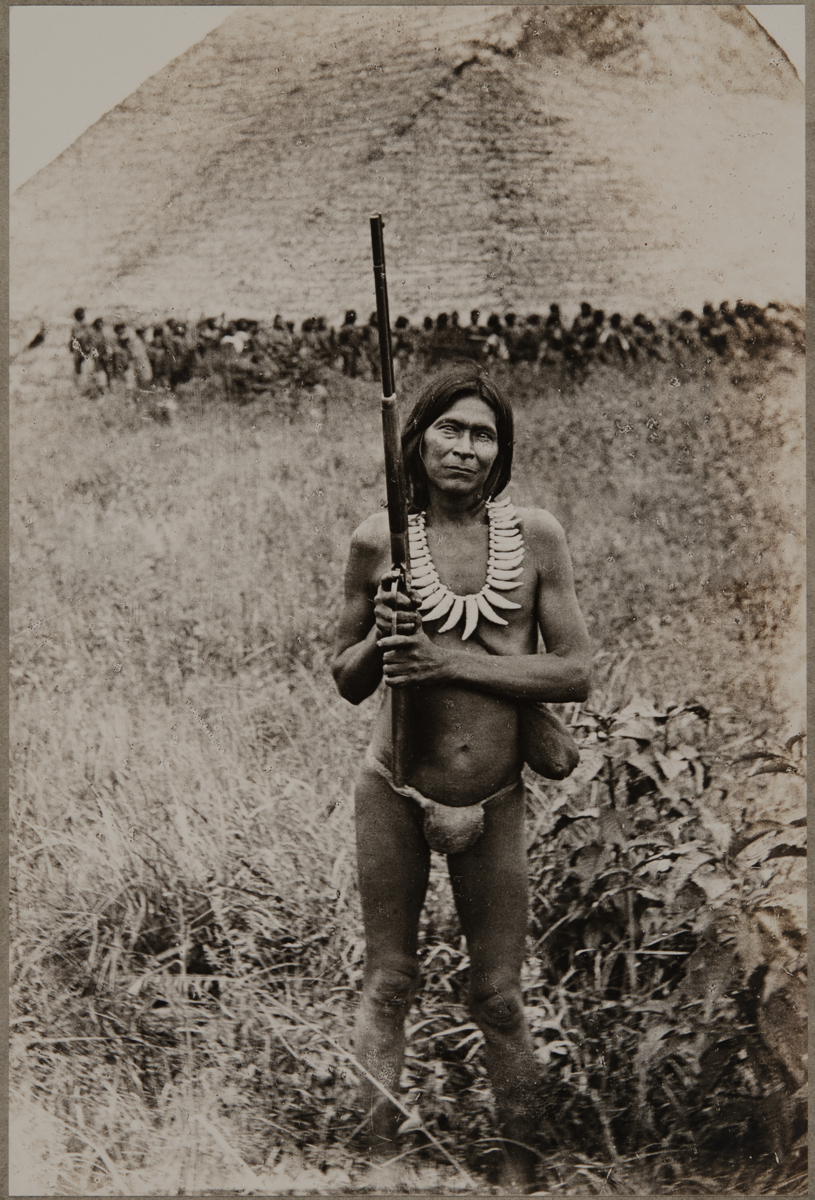
A Bora medicine man

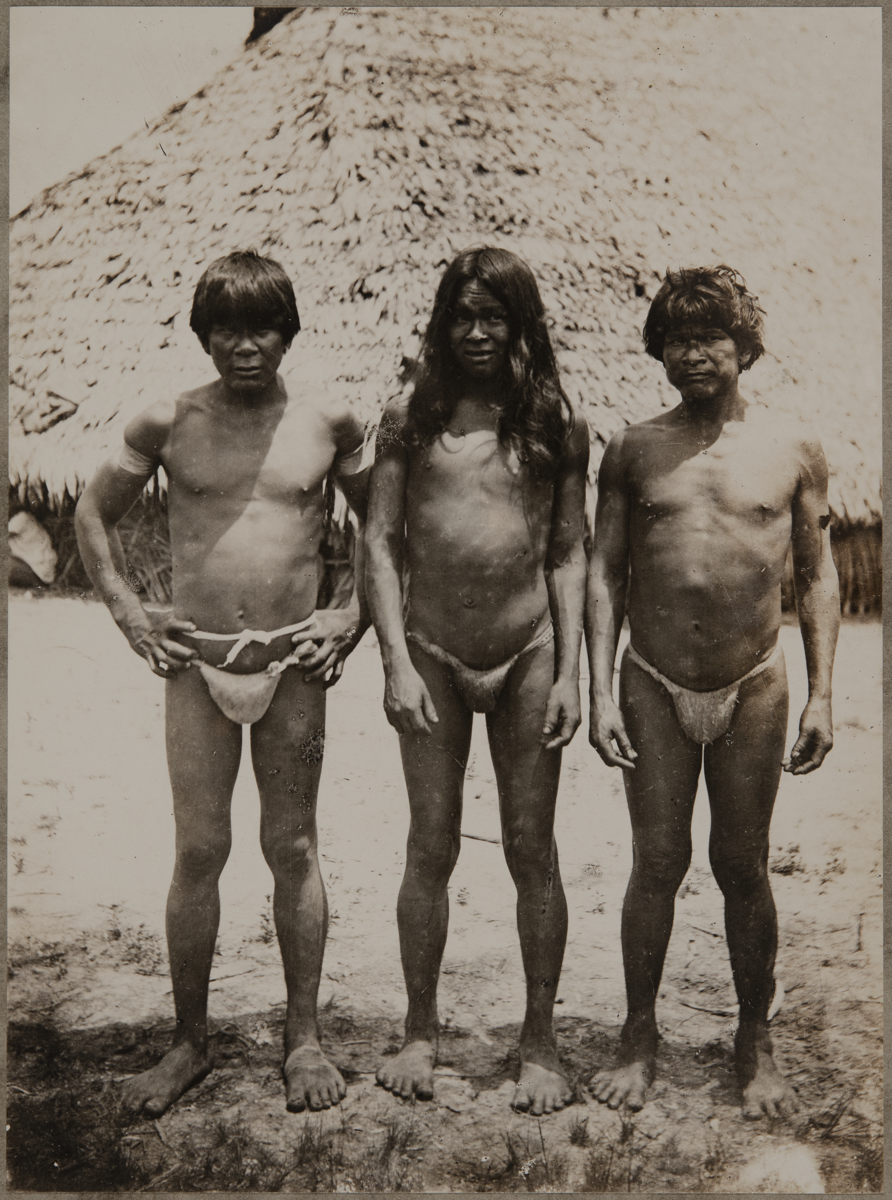
Bora tribesmen

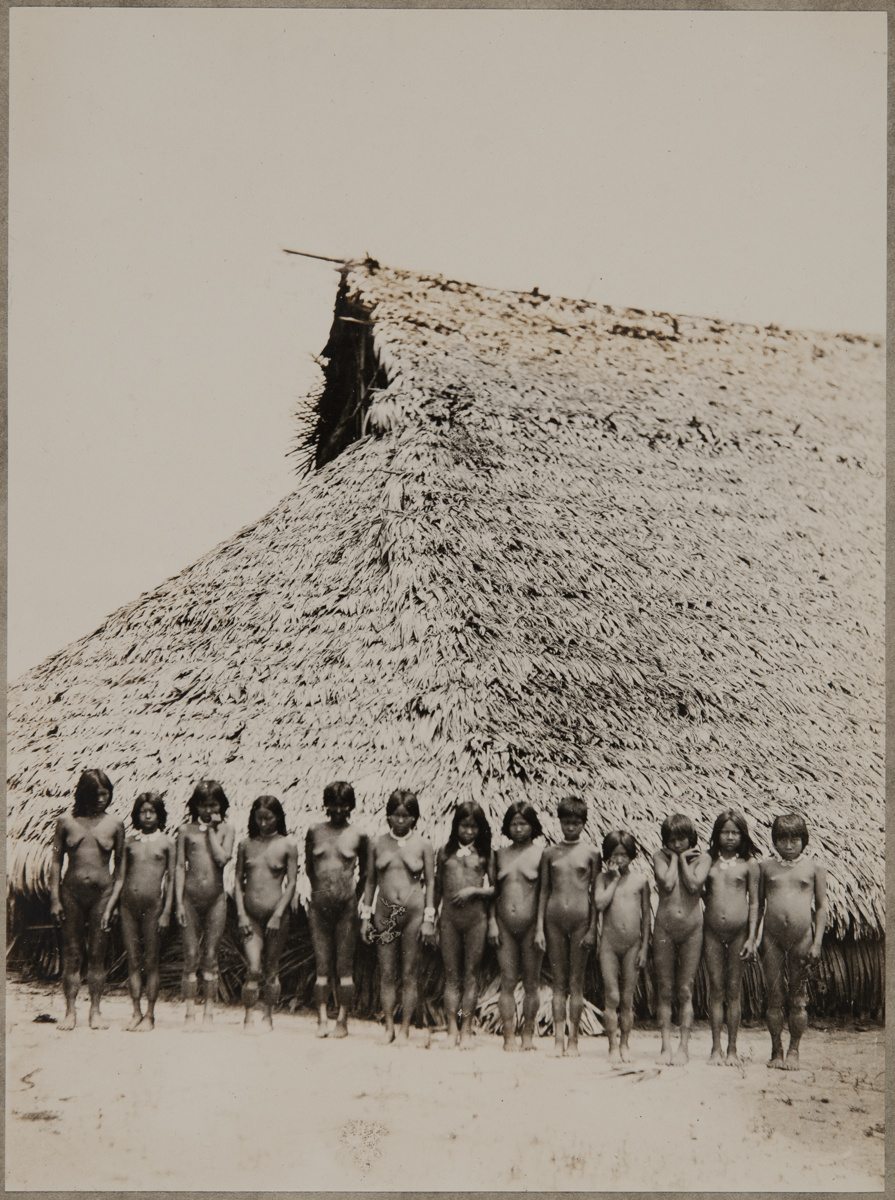
Women of the Muinane clan

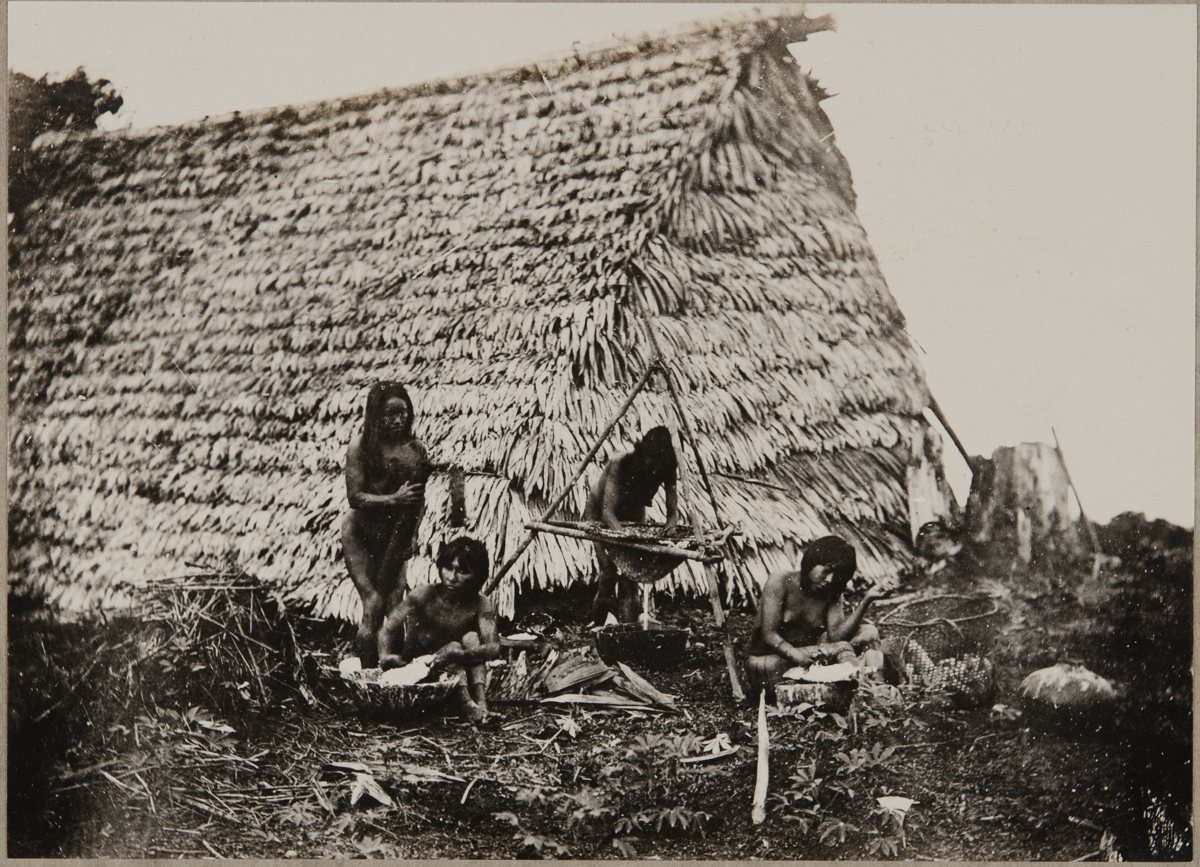
Bora women making cassava

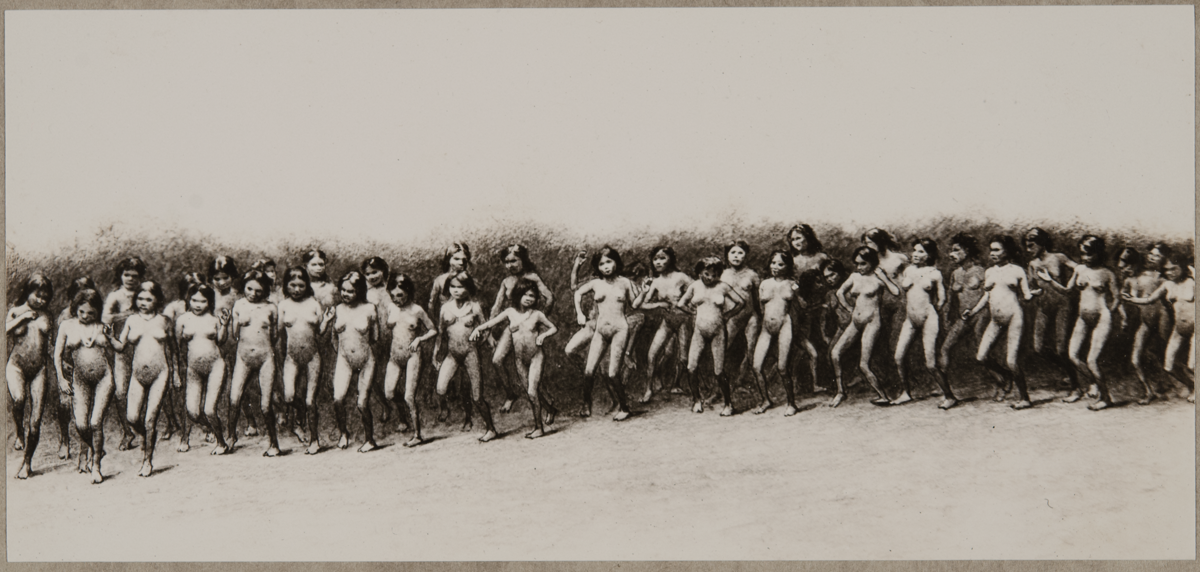
A Bora group dancing in a ritual festival

== Bibliography ==
- Harrison, Theresa; Media, Demand (n.d.). Basic Beliefs of the Bora Indians. Classroom Synonym. Retrieved on 2015-02-01 from https://classroom.synonym.com/basic-beliefs-bora-indians-6514.html.
- Hardenburg, Walter (1912). The Putumayo, the Devil's Paradise; Travels in the Peruvian Amazon Region and an Account of the Atrocities Committed Upon the Indians Therein. Putumayo: London: Fischer Unwin. ISBN 1-372-29301-9.
- Slavery in Peru: Message from the President of the United States Transmitting Report of the Secretary of State, with Accompanying Papers, Concerning the Alleged Existence of Slavery in Peru. United States. Department of State. 1913.
- Whiffen, Thomas (1915). The north-west Amazons : notes of some months spent among cannibal tribes. New York: Duffield & Co. ISBN 978-1015246713.
