= Koihoma language =

Extinct Witotoan language

Koihoma
- Coixoma, Oregone
- Native to: Peru
- Region: Amazonas
- Ethnicity: "Oregones"
- Era: attested 1850
- Language family: Bora–Huitoto ?: Huitoto–Ocaina; (unclassified); Koihoma

Language codes
- ISO 639-3: None (mis)
- Glottolog: None orej1242 uses Koihoma as an alternative name for Orejón
- Linguasphere: 83-BAG-aa

Koihoma (Coixoma), also known ambiguously as Coto (Koto) and Oregone (Orejón), neither its actual name, is an extinct, apparently Witotoan language of Peru. The name koixóma is derived from the Murui Huitoto language. According to Rafael Girard (1958), the Orejón called themselves maa i, said to bean both 'sun', 'moon' and 'people'.

== Vocabulary ==
"Oregone" (Koihoma) vocabulary
gloss	Koihoma
devil	ana
sky	muna
star	ico
cloud	iniridineu
rain	noki
sun	idoma
moon	huitsara
thunder	mouna
lightning	saitsana
earth	nani
water	ainoe
sand	mainita
tree	anaina
wood	grangai
man	comai
woman	erigno
head	huha
hair	hupodiki
eye	oi
forehead	houita
nose	hoho
mouth	huai
chin	haidaieki
ear	kinoleo
eyelash	oitka
neck	kimata
arm	narigui
chest	ongotaini
hand	onokui
finger	nokai
nail	onohaicou
leg	grasi
foot	etaiboi
dog	arricou
jaguar	huco
house	huaho
snake	taï
bow	otabi
arrow	otaki
spear	ruina
canoe	aratay
parrot	arumba
fire	raiheu
caiman	sanguini
mamoe	hugai
banana	titsa
blowgun	onia
monkey	amai
fish	jadobi
manatee	isetima
heart	ponaikiou
tapir	igataiman
macaw	coraki
curassow	miuki
flower	sariraki
river	maragnon
Pourouma cecropiifolia	ricao
Amazon River	Namani

The term maragnon was also applied to the name of the river they lived on.

== In popular culture ==
In Steven Spielberg's film Indiana Jones and the Kingdom of the Crystal Skull (2008), Indiana Jones identifies the Koihoma language on a mysterious letter Harold Oxley wrote. However, he explains to Mutt Williams that nobody speaks that language anymore. He defines it as a "Latin American language" that became extinct centuries before Spanish and Portuguese were introduced to the Americas.
