= Koeruna language =

Extinct Witotoan language of Brazil

Koeruna
- Coëruna
- Native to: Brazil
- Region: Amazonas
- Ethnicity: Koeruna
- Extinct: after 1820
- Language family: Bora–Witoto ?: Witotoan; Koeruna

Language codes
- ISO 639-3: None (mis)
- Glottolog: coer1236

Koeruna (Coeruna) is an extinct Witotoan language of Brazil. It was recorded by Carl Friedrich Philipp von Martius in his 1867 book.
