= Witotoan languages =

Language family of Colombia and Peru

Witotoan
- Huitotoan
- Geographic distribution: northwestern Amazon
- Linguistic classification: independent family or Bora–Witoto: Witotoan
- Subdivisions: Nonuya–Ocaina; Witoto proper; Andoquero †; Koeruna †; Koihoma †

Language codes
- Glottolog: huit1251

Witotoan (also Huitotoan or Uitotoan, occasionally known as Huitoto–Ocaina to distinguish it from Bora–Witoto) is a small language family of southeastern Colombia (Amazonas Department) and the neighbouring region of Peru.

== Genetic relations ==
Aschmann (1993) proposed that the Boran and Witotoan language families were related, in a Bora–Witoto stock. Echeverri & Seifart (2016) refute the connection.

== Language contact ==
Jolkesky (2016) notes that there are lexical similarities with the Pijao, Yaruro, Arawak, Bora-Muinane, Choko, and Tukano language families due to contact. Some of this contact had occurred due to the expansion of Witotoan speakers down the Putumayo River.

== Family division ==
- Witotoan
  - Ocaina (also rendered Okaina)
  - Witoto Proper
    - Nïpode (also known as Nüpode, Nipode Huitoto, Nipode Witoto, Witoto Muinane, Muinane Huitoto, Muiname)
    - Mïnïca–Murai
      - Mïnïca (also known as Witoto Meneca, Meneca, Meneka, Noaiko-Muína, Southern Witoto, Minica Huitoto, Minica)
      - Murui (also known as Witoto Murui, Murai, Búe, Murai Huitoto, Bue, Huitoto, Central Witoto proper, Komïne)
  - Nonuya (also known as Nyonuhu, Nonuña, Achote, Achiote) Loreto, Peru

The classification above is based on Campbell (1997), who follows Richard Aschmann's 1993 classification and reconstruction of Proto-Witotoan.

Nonuya is nearly extinct, but attempts are being made at revival.

The following extinct languages are unclassified within Witotoan:

- Andoquero (also known as Andokero, Miranya-Karapana-Tapuyo, Miraña, Carapana) Amazonas, Colombia (†)
- Coeruna (also known as Koeruna) Amazonas, Brazil (†)
- Koihoma (also known as Coto, Koto, Orejón, Coixoma) Loreto, Peru (†)

Kaufman (2007) adds Andoque.

Synonymy note:

- The name Muiname has been used to refer to the Muinane language (Bora Muinane) of the Boran family and also to the Nipode language (Witoto Muinane) of the Huitotoan family.
- The names Koto, Coto, and Orejón have been used to refer to the Koihoma language (Coixoma) and also to the unrelated Orejón language (also known as Koto or Coto) of the Tucanoan language family.

=== Mason (1950) ===
Internal classification of the Witotoan languages by Mason (1950):

- Witotoan
  - Witoto
    - Kaime (Caimo)
    - Xúra
    - Séueni
    - Jayruya
    - Mekka: Yaboyano
    - Menekka
    - Búe
    - Ifikuene-Caimito (?)
  - Miranyan, Boran
    - Miranya-Carapana-Tapuyo
    - Nonuya (Achiote)
    - Ocaina-Muenane
    - Ocaina (Ducaiya); Fitita (?)
    - Muenane
  - Southeastern
    - Orejón
    - Coeruna (?)
  - Andoke (?)
    - North: Araracuara
    - South
  - Resigero (?)

== Bibliography ==
- Aschmann, Richard P. (1993). Proto Witotoan. Publications in linguistics (No. 114). Arlington, TX: SIL & the University of Texas at Arlington.
- Campbell, Lyle. (1997). American Indian languages: The historical linguistics of Native America. New York: Oxford University Press. ISBN 0-19-509427-1.
- Echeverri, Juan Alvaro & Frank Seifart. (2016). Proto-Witotoan: A re-evaluation of the distant genealogical relationship between the Boran and Witotoan linguistic families.
- Kaufman, Terrence. (1990). Language history in South America: What we know and how to know more. In D. L. Payne (Ed.), Amazonian linguistics: Studies in lowland South American languages (pp. 13–67). Austin: University of Texas Press. ISBN 0-292-70414-3.
- Kaufman, Terrence. (1994). The native languages of South America. In C. Mosley & R. E. Asher (Eds.), Atlas of the world's languages (pp. 46–76). London: Routledge.
