= Bora language =

Indigenous language spoken in Amazon Basin

Bora
- Meamuyna
- Native to: Peru, Colombia
- Ethnicity: Bora people
- Native speakers: (2,400 cited 2000)
- Language family: Bora–Witoto?: Boran; Bora

Language codes
- ISO 639-3: boa
- Glottolog: bora1263
- ELP: Bora
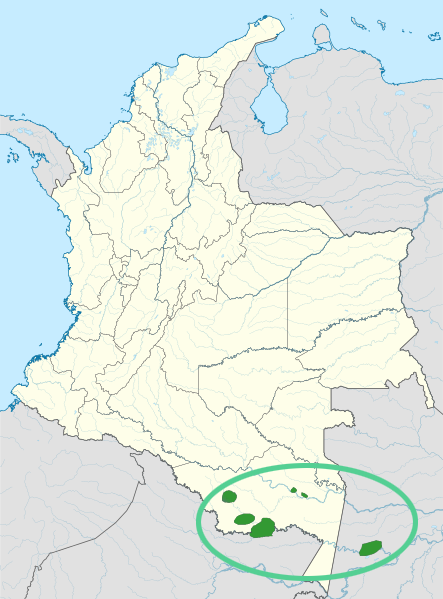

Bora is an indigenous language of South America spoken in the western region of Amazon rainforest. Bora is a tonal language which, other than the Ticuna language, is a unique trait in the region.

The majority of its speakers reside in Peru and Colombia. Around 2,328 Bora speakers live in the areas of the northeast Yaguasyacu, Putumayo and Ampiyacu rivers of Peru. There are about 500 speakers of Bora also in Colombia in the Putumayo Department. Peruvian speakers have a 10 to 30% literacy rate and a 25 to 50% literacy rate in their second language of Spanish.

Early linguistic investigators thought that Bora was related to the Witoto language, but there is very little similarity between the two.

== Dialects ==
Miraña, a dialect of Bora, is spoken along the Caquetá-Japurá river which flows from Colombia to Brazil, and a few villages are there.

Bora proper has 94% mutual comprehensibility with the Miraña dialect.

Another dialect of Bora, Muinane, which has about a 50% comprehensibility with Bora and Miraña, is spoken along tributaries of the Caquetá River in central Colombia.

Loukotka (1968) lists these dialects of Bora:

- Bora (Boro) - on the Cahuinari River and in a colony in the village of Méria on the Igara Paraná River
- Imihitä (Emejeite) - spoken on the Jacaré River
- Fa:ai - spoken in the Sierra Futahy in the same region (poorly attested, only a few words)

== Phonology ==
Vowels
	Front	Central	Back
Close	i iː	ɨ ɨː	ɯ ɯː
Mid	ɛ ɛː		o oː
Open		a aː	

- All vowels have long forms. Bora demonstrates contrastive vowel length.
- /ɛː/ before /iː/ is heard as [æː].
- /i/ is heard in shortened form as [ɪ].

Consonants
		Bilabial		Alveolar		Palatal	Velar			Glottal	
		plain	pal.	plain	pal.	Palatal	plain	pal.	labial	plain	pal.
Plosive	plain	p	pʲ	t	tʲ		k	kʲ	k͡p ~ kʷ	ʔ	ʔʲ
Plosive	aspirated	pʰ	pʲʰ	tʰ	tʲʰ		kʰ	kʲʰ			
Affricate	plain			t͡s	t͡sʲ ~ t͡ʃ						
Affricate	aspirated			t͡sʰ	t͡sʲʰ ~ t͡ʃʰ						
Fricative		β	βʲ				(x)			h	hʲ
Nasal		m	mʲ	n		ɲ					
Approximant						j					
Flap				ɾ	(ɾʲ)						

- /h/ can have an allophone of [x].
- /j/ is also heard as [ɾʲ].

== Orthography ==
The written form of Bora was developed by Wycliffe Bible Translators Wesley and Eva Thiesen with the help of the natives of the village of Brillo Nuevo on the Yaguasyacu river. Wesley and Eva Thiesen's daughter Ruth is also the first recorded non-native to learn the language. First, Bora to Spanish school books was developed. Then the New Testament Bible was translated. Finally, a comprehensive dictionary and grammar book was developed to document and preserve the language's grammar rules. This has since facilitated more textbooks so that speakers can be taught to read and write in their language, rescuing it from extinction due to the prevalence of Spanish and Portuguese in the regions where it is spoken.

== Grammar ==
Bora contains 350 classifiers, the most of any languages thus far.
