= Andoquero language =

Extinct language of Colombia

Andoquero
- Miraña-Carapana-Tapuya
- Native to: Colombia
- Region: Amazonas
- Era: attested c. 1810s
- Language family: Bora–Huitoto ?: Huitoto–Ocaina; (?); Andoquero

Language codes
- ISO 639-3: None (mis)
- Glottolog: ando1254
- Linguasphere: 83-BAE-aa

Andoquero (Miranya, Miraña-Carapana-tapuya, Miranha Carapana-Tapuya) (Note: Ethnologue has mixed this up with Carapana-tapuya. The languages clearly belong to different families.) is an extinct Witotoan language of Colombia.
