= Andaqui =

Andaqui, Andaquí, or Andaki may refer to:

- Andaquí people, an ethnic group of Colombia
- Andaqui language, a language of Colombia

== See also ==
- Andaqui terrane, a subdivision of the Chibcha terrane
- Andoque (disambiguation) (a people and a language of Colombia)
