= Nonuya language =

Witotoan language of Colombia and Peru

Nonuya
- Nononotá
- Native to: Colombia, Peru
- Ethnicity: Nonuya peoples
- Extinct: 2003, with the death of Humberto Ayarce; 6 semispeakers (2015)
- Revival: 1991
- Language family: Bora–Huitoto ?: Witotoan; Nonuya

Language codes
- ISO 639-3: noj
- Glottolog: nonu1241
- ELP: Nonuya

Nonuya (Nononotá, Nyonuhu, Nonuña, Achiote) is a Witotoan language formerly spoken in Colombia and Peru that is now extinct. Genocide, disease, and forced migration caused the Sparrowhawk and Backpacker tribes to form families with the Andoke and the Muinane to create the Nonuya community. Most Nonuya have Muinane and Spanish as their native languages.

There are no surviving Nonuya people with Nononotá as their mother tongue as the last native speaker, Humberto Ayarce, drowned accidentally in 2003. However, the Nonuya community has recently reestablished itself, and is attempting to revitalize its culture through revitalizing its language. The Nonuya use the available documentation created by the last native speakers between 1973 and 2007, which include prayers, songs, and a lexicon, to relearn the language. These documents are accessible today in audio files and transcripts which can be used for practical spelling.

== Phonology ==
Some of the only linguistic research on Nonuya was on its phonological and phonetic features. Nonuya has 6 vowels and 15 consonants. Nonuya has no nasal vowels, similar to its predecessor Witotoan.

Vowels
	Front	Central	Back
Close	i	ɨ	u
Mid	e		o
Open		a	

Nonuya's six vowel system is typical of Northwest Amazonian languages.

Consonants
		Bilabial	Alveolar	Postalveolar	Palatal	Velar	Glottal
Nasal		m	n		ɲ		
Stop	voiceless	p	t		tʲ	k	ʔ
Stop	voiced	b	d			g	
Affricate	voiceless		t͡s	t͡ʃ			
Affricate	voiced		d͡z	d͡ʒ			
Fricative	voiceless	ɸ		ʃ			h
Fricative	voiced	β					
Flap			ɾ				

Some sources also suggest that Nonuya has two implosive sounds (/ɗ/ and /ɓ/), and distinguish labialised consonants.

== Grammar ==
Not much is known about Nonuya grammar as, until recently, the only linguistic studies done on Nonuya were on phonetic/phonological analysis but it can be inferred through the typical features known to Witotoan languages and the 1953 lexicon.

=== Features of Witotoan languages ===
- All Witotoan languages are nominative-accusative with agreement shown on the heads of phrases (head marking) and some elements of agreement marked on the dependent element of a phrase (dependent marking).
- They are predominantly agglutinating with some fusion and mostly suffixing. Though there are a few cases of prefixes.
- Syntactic functions are expressed using cross-referencing on the verb and case marking
- Word order is typically Agent Object Verb (SOV), but it may change, depending on context, to SVO
- Pronouns distinguish between male/female singular, male/female dual, and male/female plural

=== Cases ===
There are six syntactical cases and seven locative cases in Nonuya: nominative, accusative, genitive, dative, ablative, locative, and instrumental. The locative case includes pi : "in", wan or piwan : "with" used as both "in the company of" and instrumental, wan can also be used in some contexts to mean "in addition". Paq : "for" (interest, aim, duration), rayku : "due to, in sight of", kama : "until" "while" "according to" "all together", pura : "in a pair" "from among a group" and ntin, whose form is difficult to analyse but is recorded as meaning "all together", "with"

== Lexicon ==
The first wordlist of Nonuya was created by Marquis Robert de Wavrin and Paul Rivet in 1953 and included 394 words and expressions. The document compares Nonuya, Ocaina, and Witoto.

English	Nonuya	Ocaina	Witoto
Good morning	wətsihōmonāhĭ	wo(h)ə(ü)kaj(w)ə(ü)ra	māreho(wi)
Yesterday	bohōf(w)ə	ə(ü)tǒ	nayfotomonay
Man	hǒkká	hōh'ə	uey(ma)
