= Andokides =

Andokides or Andocides (Ancient Greek: Ἀνδοκίδης) may refer to:

- Andocides, one of the Attic orators
- Andokides (potter), a sixth-century potter whose wares were decorated by the Andokides painter
