= Cahuinari River =

Coordinates: 1.2292°S 72.1758°W

- Location within Colombia

Location
- Country: Colombia

Physical characteristics
- Mouth: Caquetá River
- Length: 400 km (250 mi)

Cahuinari River (Spanish pronunciation: [kawiˈnaɾi]) is a river of Colombia. It is part of the Amazon River basin.

== See also ==
- List of rivers of Colombia
