= Bora–Witoto languages =

Proposed language family of South America

Bora–Witóto
- Witotoan
- (controversial)
- Geographic distribution: northwestern Amazon
- Linguistic classification: Proposed language family
- Subdivisions: ? Andoque–Urequena; Boran; Witotoan

Language codes
- Glottolog: None
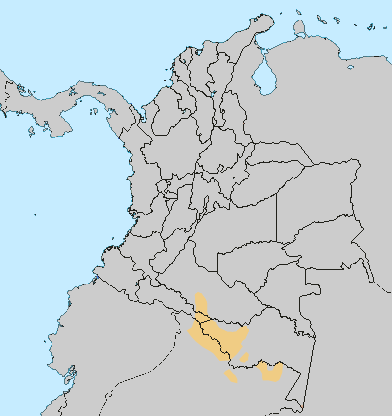

Bora–Witóto (also Bora–Huitoto, Bora–Uitoto, or, ambiguously, Witotoan) is a proposal to unite the Boran and Witotoan language families of southwestern Colombia (Amazonas Department) and neighboring regions of Peru and Brazil. Kaufman (1994) added the Andoque language.

== Family division ==
- Boran
- Witotoan (or Witoto–Ocaina)

Kaufman (1994) lists Bóran and Witótoan (Huitoto–Ocaina) as separate families (they are grouped together with Andoque as Bora–Witótoan; by 2007 he moved Andoque to Witotoan).

== Genetic relations ==
Aschmann (1993) proposed Bora–Witoto as a connection between the Boran and Witotoan language families. Echeverri & Seifart (2016) refute the connection.

Kaufman (2007) includes Bora-Witoto in his Macro-Andean proposal, and added the Andoque language to the Witotoan family. (Aschmann had considered Andoque a language isolate.) These proposals have not been accepted by other linguists. Gildea and Payne (2007) checked Bora-Witoto with Andoque, Proto-Cariban and Yagua, and found Bora-Witoto to be not related to any of the others.

Mason (1950: 236–238) groups Bora–Witoto, Tupian, and Zaparoan together as part of a proposed Macro-Tupí-Guaranían family.

== Vocabulary ==
Below is a comparison of selected basic vocabulary items in Proto-Bora-Muinane (i.e., Proto-Boran), Bora, Proto-Witotoan, Witoto, and Andoque.

gloss	Proto-Bora-Muinane	Bora	Proto-Witotoan	Witoto	Andoque
head	*niga-ɨ	nīːkʷàɯ̀		ɨɸogɨ	-tai
hair	*-hee-	níːkʷākō		ɨɸotɨraɨ	ka-tai ʌka-be
eye	*aʤɨ-ɨ	ācɯ̄ː		uˑɨθɨ	-ʔákʌ
ear	*nɨ()-meeʔu	nɯ́mɨ̄̇ō	?**()po	heɸo	-bei
nose	*tɨhɨ-ʔu	Tɨ́hɨ̄̇ò	*topo-(ʔ)	doɸo	-pɤta
tooth	*iʔgai	íʔkʷāhɨ̀	?**iiʔ-gi-()	iθido	-kódi
tongue	*nehe	nɨ́ːhɨ̄̇ʔkʷā	?**()pe	iɨɸe	-sodɤ̃
mouth	*i-hɨ	īʔhʲɯ̀	**(-)po(e)	ɸue	-ɸi
hand	*ʔutʦe	ōhtsɨ̄̇		onoɟɨ	-dobi
foot	*ttɨʔaai	mēhtíā	**(ï)ta() (lower leg)	eˑɨɟɨ	-dʌka
breast	*mɨppaino		**xebae-gaï		-ɲeé
meat	*ʔookuu, *duu	éːkó		ɟɨkɨθi	-ɤ̃ta
blood	*tɨɨ		**tï-xë(ʔe)	dɨe	-duʔs
bone	*bakkɨ	p̻āhkɯ̄		iɟaikɨ	-tadɤ̃
person	*m()a-mɨnaa-ppi (sg.), *m()a-mɨnaa (pl.)	kʷàhp̻ì		ɨima	ʝóʔhʌ
name	*momo		**maime	mamekɨ	-ti
dog	*ʔuuʔi	ōíp̻ʲē	**xï̄ʔko	hɨko	ĩɲõ
fish		āmōmè		ɟɨkɨaɨ	bei
louse	*gaaini-ʔu	kʷāánī		ɨboma	táʔsi
tree	*ɨmo-ʔo	ɯ̄mèè	?**(aï)me()	amena	kɤ̃́ʔɤ̃dɤ
leaf	*-ʔaame	ɨ́nāʔámɨ̄̇		rabe	-sedɤ̃
flower				θaɸia	
water	*nɨ-ppai()u	nēhp̻ākʲō	**nō-()	hɨnui	dúʔu
fire	*kɨɨhɨ-gai	kɯ́ːhɯ̄kʷā		irai	ʌʔpa
stone		néékʷājī	**goti-	noɸɨkɨ	ɸisi
earth	*hiinɨ-he	ìīɲɯ̀	*xáénï̄ʔ-xë	enɨe	ɲṍʔĩ
salt	*ɨmo		**(ï)xaidzaï(ga)	ɨaiθaɨ	
road			**(na)xï̄()	naˑɨθo	dubɤ, õbɤ
eat	*matʧu		**d(o)ʔ, **gōī(ne)	guite	-baʔi-
die	*gihe-βo			baˑɨde	ĩ-hʌ́ʌ-
I	*uu	ōō	**(k)ōō-xe(ʔe)	kue	o-ʔɤ
you	*ɨɨ		**ō-xe(ʔe)	o	ha-ʔɤ

== Bibliography ==
- Aschmann, Richard P. (1993). Proto Witotoan. Publications in linguistics (No. 114). Arlington, TX: SIL & the University of Texas at Arlington.
- Campbell, Lyle. (1997). American Indian languages: The historical linguistics of Native America. New York: Oxford University Press. ISBN 0-19-509427-1.
- Echeverri, Juan Alvaro & Frank Seifart. (2016). Proto-Witotoan: A re-evaluation of the distant genealogical relationship between the Boran and Witotoan linguistic families.
- Gildea, Spike and Doris Payne. (2007). Is Greenberg's "Macro-Carib" viable? Bol. Mus. Para. Emílio Goeldi. Ciencias Humanas, Belém, v. 2, n. 2, p. 19-72, May-Aug. 2007 Online version: http://www.museu-goeldi.br/editora/bh/artigos/chv2n2_2007/Greenbergs(gildea).pdf
- Greenberg, Joseph H. (1987). Language in the Americas. Stanford: Stanford University Press.
- Kaufman, Terrence. (1990). Language history in South America: What we know and how to know more. In D. L. Payne (Ed.), Amazonian linguistics: Studies in lowland South American languages (pp. 13–67). Austin: University of Texas Press. ISBN 0-292-70414-3.
- Kaufman, Terrence. (1994). The native languages of South America. In C. Mosley & R. E. Asher (Eds.), Atlas of the world's languages (pp. 46–76). London: Routledge.
