= Armando Normand =

Peruvian and Bolivian rubber plantation manager and mass murderer (born 1880)

Armando Normand (1880–disappeared May 1915) was a plantation manager of Peruvian and Bolivian descent who had a central role in the Peruvian Amazon Company's perpetration of the Putumayo genocide. For six years in the Putumayo, Normand committed uncounted abuses against the indigenous population.

Normand worked for the company, which extracted rubber with illegal slave labour, between 1904 and October 1910. During those years, he led a reign of terror against local indigenous populations. According to British consul-general Roger Casement, who investigated crime in the Putumayo River basin in 1910, Normand committed "innumerable murders and tortures" during this period. Several of the crimes that Normand was incriminated with include immolation, bashing out the brains of children, and dismemberment.

Reports and evidence of Normand's crimes were first documented by Benjamin Saldaña Rocca in 1907, Roger Casement in 1910, and Judge Carlos A. Valcarcel in 1915. A warrant for Normand's arrest was issued by Judge Rómulo Paredes on 29 June 1911 along with 214 other men employed by the Peruvian Amazon Company's agency at La Chorrera. Normand was arrested in 1912, however he escaped from prison with Aurelio Rodriguez in 1915 prior to a verdict in their trial.

== Early life ==
Armando Normand was born in Cochabamba, Bolivia, in around 1880. It is believed he spent the first twenty years of his life in and around Cochabamba. The little information about Normand's early life comes from an interview conducted by Peter MacQueen in 1913, during which Normand said:

Our family was one of the first in the Province of Cochabamba, and I was afforded excellent opportunities for securing an education. After graduating from the Seminario in my native city, I spent two years studying law, but finally abandoned [the] course and went to the Argentine. I attended the National School of Commerce in Buenos Ayres and graduated from that institution as a public accountant. Altogether I remained about two and one-half years in Buenos Ayres. In 1903 I went to London and studied for a few months at the Pitman School in Russell Square in order to improve my knowledge of bookkeeping and modern business.

Roger Casement wrote that he had seen two of Normand's academic certificates, including one from the London School of Book-keepers dated 1904, which qualified Normand as a bookkeeper.

== Career ==
While in London, Normand became friends with the Bolivian minister Avelino Aramayo and through this connection he became acquainted with influential people from Peru and Bolivia. Normand left London in 1904 and travelled to Pará, Brazil, with a letter of introduction to Carlos Larrañaga, the regional manager for Suárez Hermanos, a famous rubber firm in Bolivia. Because there were no open positions at the firm, Larrañaga advised Normand to travel to Manaus, and Larrañaga also wrote letters of introduction for Normand to Julio César Arana, owner of J. C. Arana and Hermanos Company. Arana's company hired Normand, assigning him as an interpreter on a mission to hire workers in Barbados. This mission managed to contract around thirty five Barbadians (Note: In 1913, Normand claimed that there were thirty six Barbadian men hired on this mission, however Roger Casement's information in 1910 stated there were thirty Barbadian men and five women contracted by this mission.) to work on the Igaraparana River, a tributary of the Putumayo River.

In November 1904, Normand arrived at La Chorrera with the first contingent of Barbadian men, and was commissioned with those men to set up a settlement near the Caqueta River and engage in "trade relations" with Andoque tribespeople. (Note: The Andoques people were situated between the Igaraparana River and the Caqueta River. Most of the Andoque people lived closer to the Caqueta River than towards the Igaraparana. The Barbadian Westerman Leavine stated that the expedition to establish Matanzas left La Chorrera on November 17, 1904.) The group was led by a Colombian named Ramon Sanchez, they established a station that became known as Matanzas. (Note: Augustus Walcott, one of the Barbadian men, provided a deposition to Roger Casement in 1910. Walcott mentioned that he participated in building the first "house" at Matanzas. One day, a group of sixteen indigenous people, which were chained, were brought to the construction site "to help build the house.") Shortly after the construction of a house, the group began correrias, or slave raids, (Note: Slavery was abolished in Peru in 1854, however debt peonage was a legal practice used by Arana's firm to keep indigenous people in captivity during Normand's employment in the Putumayo.) and what Roger Casement referred to as "punitive expeditions". The J.C. Arana y Hermanos agents at Matanzas were armed with firearms to hunt indigenous people and they intended to force those people to collect rubber. In 1905, Normand was made co-manager of the Matanzas station after the dismissal of Sanchez for physically abusing the Barbadian men, and in 1906, Normand became the chief manager of Matanzas.

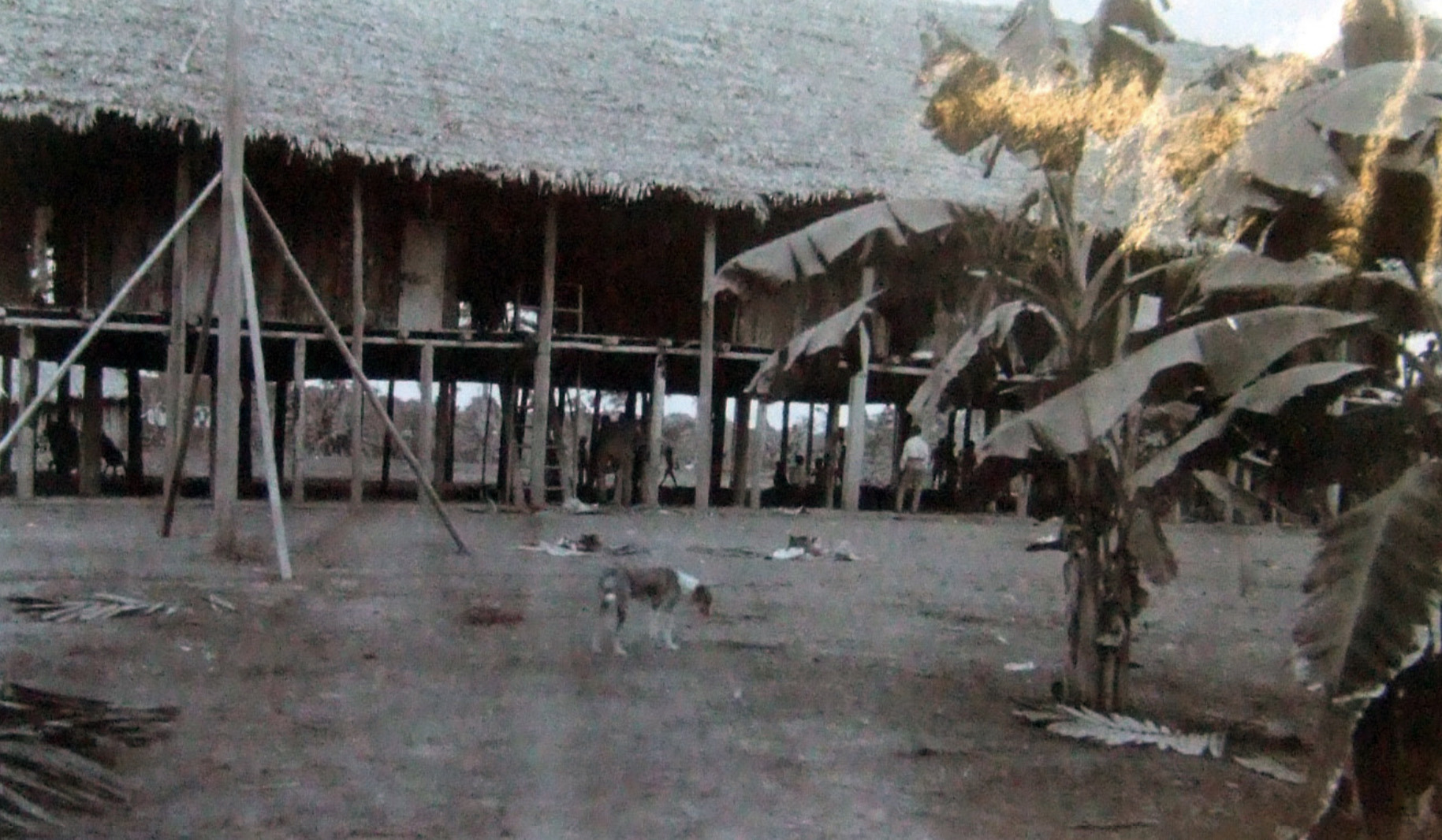
Photograph of the Matanzas rubber station, taken by Roger Casement. It was reported that limbs were often kept and eaten by the dogs kept by Armando Normand at Matanzas.

By 1907, Normand and his employer Arana were subjects of complaints made by Benjamin Saldaña Rocca, a journalist from Iquitos who was determined to hold them responsible for their crimes. Saldaña used statements and first-hand accounts from former workers of the rubber stations, publishing them in La Felpa and La Sancion, two small newspapers from Iquitos. For three years before Casement's investigation, Normand's crimes were well known in Peru. According to Casement's report:

It was alleged, and I am convinced with truth, that during the period of close on six years Normand had controlled the Andokes Indians he had directly killed 'many hundreds' of those Indians—men, women, and children. The indirect deaths due to starvation, floggings, exposure, and hardship of various kinds in collecting rubber or transferring it from Andokes down to Chorrera must have accounted for a still larger number. Señor Tizon told me that 'hundreds' of Indians perished in the compulsory carriage of the rubber from the more distant sections down to La Chorrera. No food is given by the company to these unfortunate people on these forced marches, which, on an average, take place three times a year. I witnessed one such march, on a small scale ... (Note: Casement witnessed around 200 Andoke people marching their loads of rubber from Matanzas to La Chorrera in 1910.)

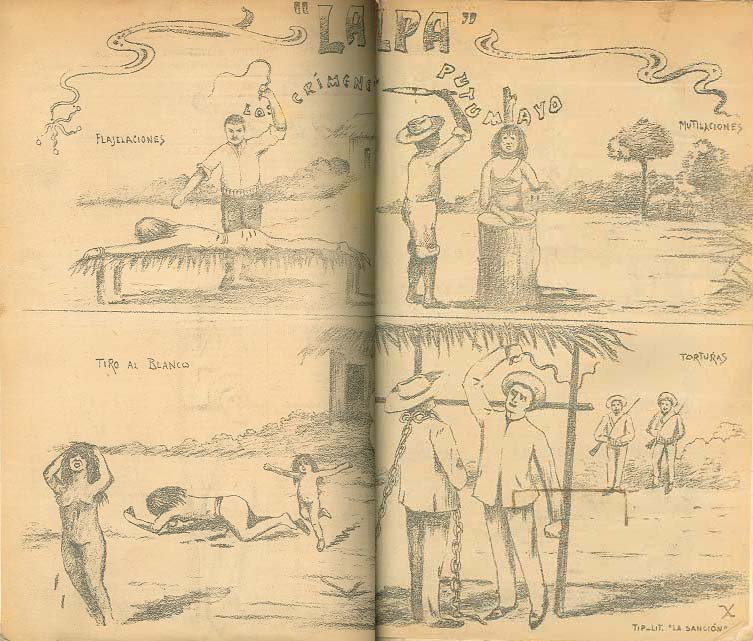
Illustration on the first issue of 'LA FELPA'

Enslaved locals were expected to gather between 50 and 100 kg (110 and 220 lb) of rubber in a fabrico depending on their assigned quota. The indigenous people marched along with their loads of rubber to Matanzas from areas in the forest that were, in some cases, a ten-to-twelve hours distance by foot. The land route to deliver rubber from Matanzas to La Chorrera was estimated by Casement to be 110 kilometres (70 miles), and could take "four to five days of hard marching" to traverse by the Barbadian men, which escorted the indigenous workers.

Around 1907, a small steamship was launched on the Igaraparana River above the waterfall of La Chorrera, shortening the distance that indigenous people entrapped at Matanzas had to travel in order to deliver rubber to La Chorrera. (Note: This may have been the steamship Veloz, which was stationed on the Igaraparana River above La Chorrera.) From Matanzas, they were to travel to Entre Rios, a two-day walk, and then to a place named Puerto Peruano, which was around 64 km (40 miles) or more from Matanzas, with little to no food. At Puerto Peruano, the rubber carried by the indigenous people was then loaded onto a boat and shipped to La Chorrera. In 1910, Casement estimated that over the course of the whole march, natives would walk 97 kilometres (60 miles) or more to deliver rubber to La Chorrera and he stated the path was "one of the worst imaginable". These marches from Matanzas to La Chorrera usually occurred twice in year, after a collection period referred to as a fabrico. A fabrico referred to the season that rubber was extracted, this time period could last between 75 and 100 days. (Note: Casement wrote "At Matanzas the weight of a full-grown man's 'fabrico' was even up to 80-100 kilograms, more than could be carried by a single individual. In such a case the Indian would have his wife and children to help in carrying it down to Puerto Peruano for shipment to La Chorrera.")

When Normand became the station manager in 1906, for every 15 kg (33 lb) of rubber collected by enslaved indigenous people, he received three soles. At the time of Casement's visit in 1910, Normand was making around 20 soles for every 15 kg (33 lb) of rubber, which was 20% of the station's generated profit. The manager of La Chorrera told Casement the company owed Normand 18,000 soles before a harvest of rubber in 1910—around £1,800—and Casement believed that Normand would get paid £300 for that collection period based on the output of Matanzas. According to Normand in 1910, 120 men, who could annually bring in around 16,800 kg (37,000 lb) of rubber, were being forced to work at the Matanzas station. The number of people kept captive to work at Matanzas prior to Casement's visit is unknown, however the information given the American Consul in Iquitos, claimed that there were 5,000 indigenous people dedicated to extracting rubber for the Matanzas station in 1907. The manager at La Chorrera, Juan A. Tizón, also told Casement the company had been running the Matanza station at a loss for a few years.

After meeting Armando Normand in 1910, Roger Casement wrote:

he is the ablest of these scoundrels we have met yet, and I should say far the most dangerous. The others were murderous maniacs mostly, or rough, cruel ignorant men ... This is an educated man of a sort, who has lived long in London, knows the meaning of his crimes and their true aspect in all civilized eyes.

Normand left the company a month or two after Casement's visit; he had requested to separate from the firm in a letter the previous year. According to Normand, at the time, he was "often ill and had symptoms of the dread beri-beri". When Victor Macedo, the general manager at La Chorrera, heard about Normand's request for resignation, he asked Normand to stay longer at the Matanzas station because they had no one to replace him. When British consul George Mitchell and American consul Stuart J. Fuller visited the Putumayo in October 1912, they visited every plantation where atrocities had been reported except for Abisinia and Matanzas. By then, the Matanzas plantation was completely abandoned.

== Role in the Putumayo genocide ==
Armando Normand committed numerous crimes in the Putumayo River basin, which members of the Peruvian Amazon Company witnessed. Several witnesses who came forward include Roso España, Marcial Gorries, Genaro Caporo and Barbadians Westerman LevineFrederick Bishop (Barbadian) and Joshua Dyall. Some of these first-hand accounts were used as evidence in the La Sancion and La Felpa publications that exposed the company in Peru, Roger Casement's report and an extensive report released by the United States relating to slavery in Peru.

Judge Carlos A. Valcárcel initiated an investigative commission in 1911 to find new information; the first-hand accounts from ex-employees who worked under Normand make up the majority of the 'Andoques' chapter in his book El proceso del Putumayo y sus secretos inauditos. Judge Rómulo Paredes conducted the actual investigation around La Chorrera and Matanzas, he collected physical evidence and included numerous eyewitness accounts in his 3,000-page manuscript relating to the atrocities. In 1911, Paredes described Matanzas as "completely annihilated and almost extinguished".

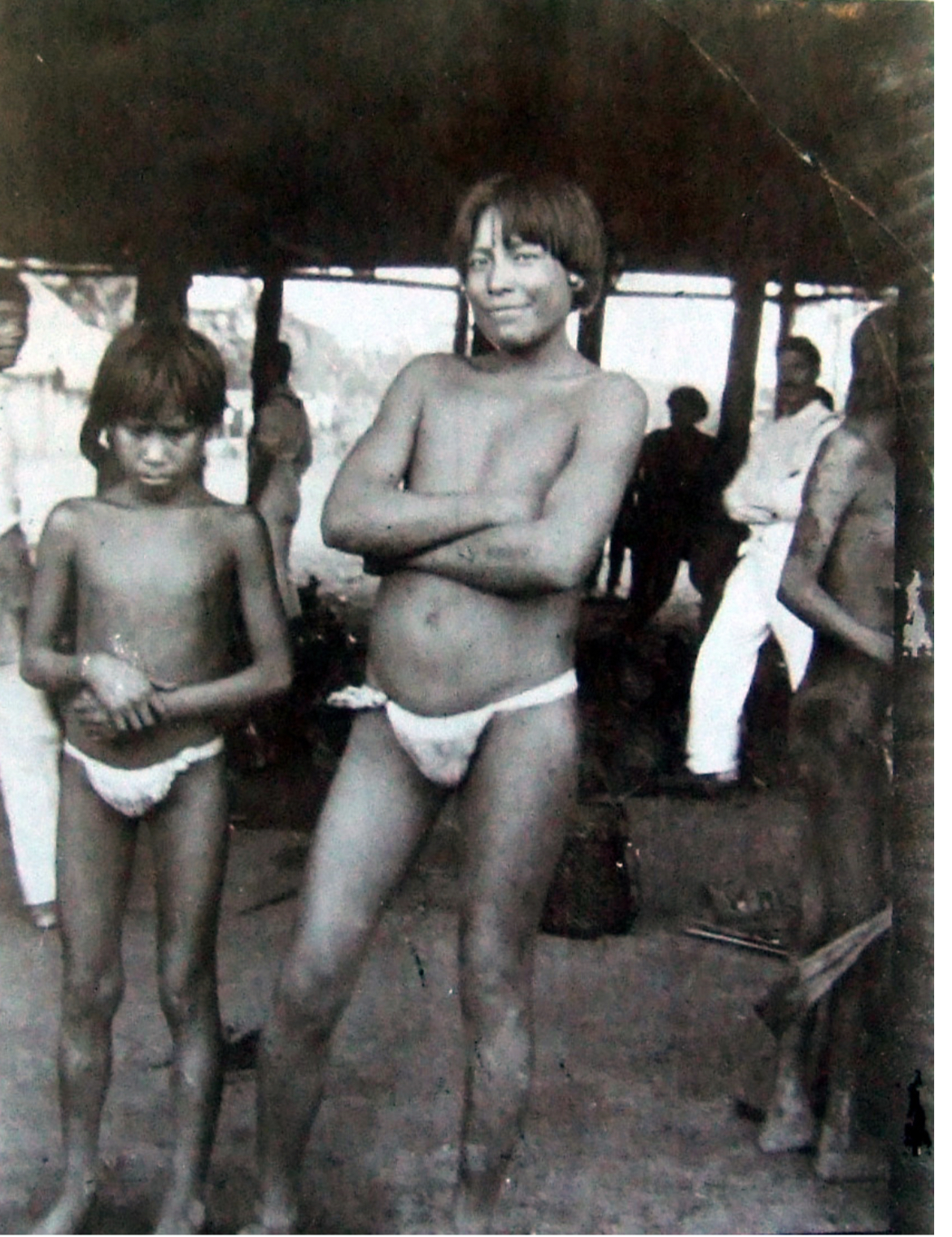
"Two Andoke boys. They had just arrived with their loads of rubber. Casement mentions that "this tribe, once numerous, is now reduced all told to probably 150 persons, murdered by Armando Normand".

=== The crimes of Armando Normand ===
Normand starved the indigenous people under his control, giving them no food and little-to-no time to cultivate food. On occasion, Normand used starvation until death as a means of capital punishment. Ildefonso Fachin, a Peruvian Amazon Company employee and deponent to judge Paredes, claimed that Normand had cut down crop fields in order to starve the indigenous people that he could not capture.

Near the end of 1904 or the beginning of 1905, Augustus Walcott was physically abused by Normand and Ramon Sanchez. Normand had Walcott "hung up by his arms tied behind his back for a very long time, and beaten with swords or machetes." Clifford Quintin was also abused by Normand on two separate occasions. (Note: This punishment was administered over a dispute when Quintin was trying to barter food from an indigenous woman. The first punishment administered to Quintin was carried out in a similar manner to Normand's treatment of Walcott, on the second occasion Quintin was beaten by Normand and Ursenio Bucelli.) The scarring from Normand's flagellation of Walcott was shown to Roger Casement in 1910. Another Barbadian named Percy, or James Francis was also tied up and flogged by swords under Sanchez's orders, however there is very little information regarding that incident. Augustus Walcott provided a depositional statement to Roger Casement in 1910, in that statement Walcott claimed that Normand told the local indigenous people that the Barbadian men were cannibals and that they would eat the people who refused to collect rubber. (Note: "Señor Normand had so described the Barbados men on bringing them among the Andokes Indians, in order to terrify the Indians.")

The first issue of Benjamin Saldaña Rocca's newspaper La Sancion, published on August 22, 1907, contained an account from Julio Muriedas, who worked under Normand. Muriedas stated Normand administered 200 or more whiplashes to his enslaved workers that did not meet a weight quota of rubber. When the indigenous people tried to flee, J.C. Arana y Hermanos agents took their children and suspended them by their hands as well as feet before torturing them with fire with the intention of extracting information that would expose indigenous families' hiding places. This claim was later corroborated by Westerman Leavine, a Barbadian, in a deposition to Roger Casement in 1910. Leavine stated that punishment was administered often, as well as the burning of children in order to coerce them to reveal the locations of their relatives. Muriedas, Genaro Caporo, Leavine and Adolfo Lopez, all of whom were Normand's subordinates at one time or another, testified that they had seen Normand's dog at Matanzas carrying around severed limbs or other human flesh, which was consumed by the dog. Lopez stated that he saw one of the dogs, "which slept in the same room as" Normand, "bringing her puppies pieces of flesh torn from the buttocks of whipped Indians." In his deposition, Lopez also mentioned that the area of Matanzas had an "unbearable stench emanating from the Indians' wounds." Leavine told Casement that the stench emanating from rotting corpses and festering wounds at Matanzas was so bad that he could not consume food.

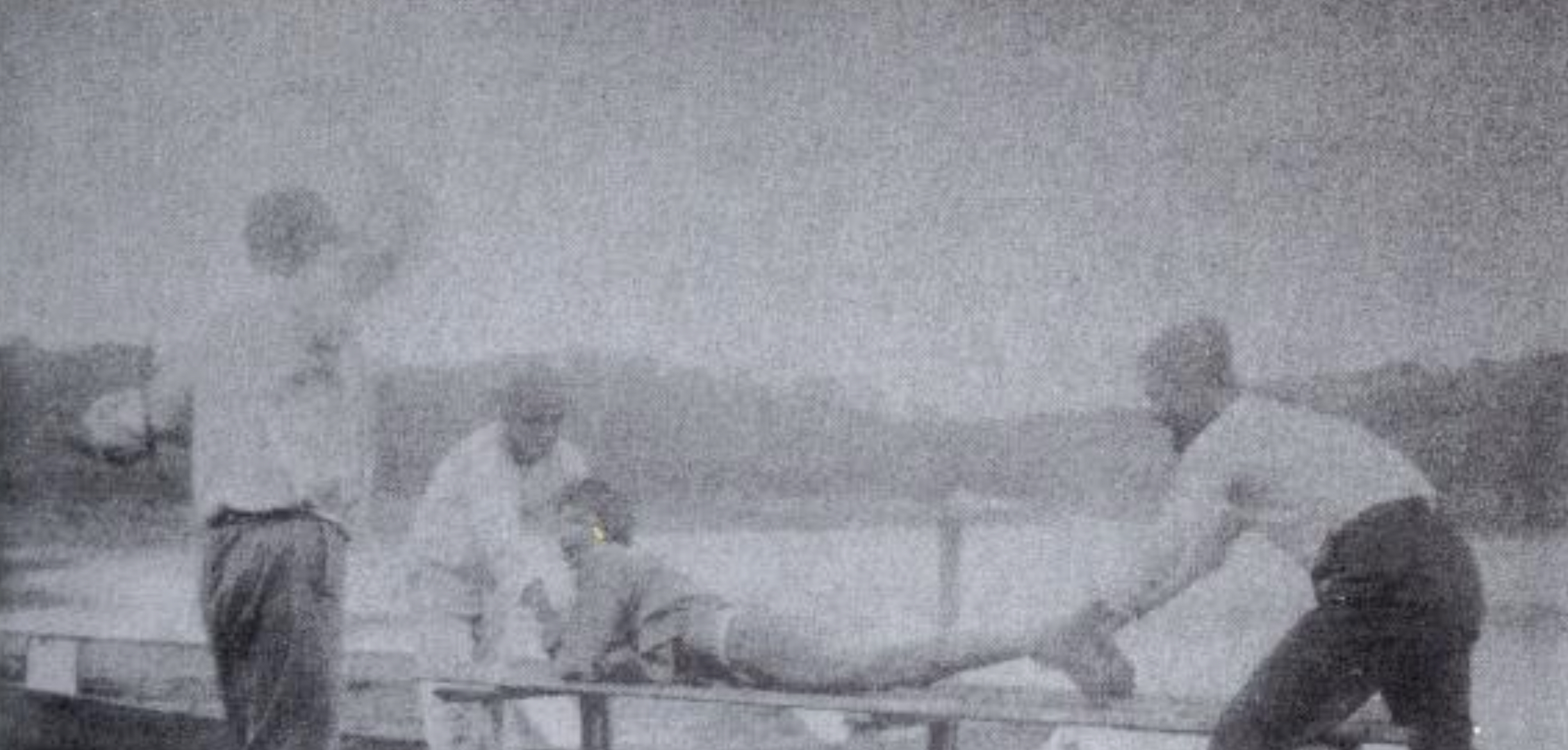
Flogging of a Putumayo native, carried out by the employees of Julio César Arana

Sidney Morris was at Andokes for three or four months, until he became ill. He was employed there on correrias, and stated that while he did not flog people there, he witnessed a number of flagellations while under Normand's management. Morris stated that Normand would administer the first couple of lashes before handing the whip to another employee to continue the punishment. "They [the indigenous] were flogged badly, men and women and children. He saw a boy, a small boy, flogged to death..." (Note: "He saw a girl flogged to death as well as the small boy.") Morris stated some of the indigenous men who were flogged at Matanzas also perished from their wounds. He also witnessed the shooting of multiple indigenous people, and the immolation, as well as the shooting of one indigenous man that Normand had caught. Morris reported that he knew of another native that Normand had ordered to be executed by burning to death. Morris stated that while he didn't witness this killing, he heard Normand give the order and he also saw the Muchachos de Confianza making preparations for the fire. Morris left Matanzas in May 1906, and returned in May 1909 after four Peruvian Amazon Company employees had been killed by rebellious muchachos de confianzas at an outpost near Matanzas. (Note: See The Amazon Journal of Roger Casement page 266 for a description of the "great Caqueta Rebellion" that resulted in the deaths of four employees.) He stayed in the area for two months hunting down the indigenous people that had killed the employees and taken their weapons.

In January 1907, Normand led an attack against employees of Urbano Gutierrez, a Colombian rubber firm, which was attempting to establish an outpost near the Caqueta River. A group of twenty Peruvians, along with two Barbadians, (Note: These two Barbadians were Westerman Leavine and Donald Francis. Normand attempted to bribe Leavine with an incentive to not give a deposition to Casement. Francis admitted to Casement that Macedo had offered him a bribe as well as threatened to have Francis shot if he testified against Macedo. Casement regarded Francis as an unreliable witness for this reason.) came across eight people that were separated from the main group of Colombians, and killed two while taking the rest as prisoners. The Peruvians sent a letter to Normand, who arrived three days later with another group of subordinates. Normand interrogated the prisoners and he ordered the chief of these Colombians, Felipe Cabrera, to send a message to his partner José de la Paz Gutiérrez to surrender all of the fire arms his group had. Roso España was a Colombian employed by Urbano Gutierrez and he provided an eyewitness account for this raid led by Normand. España claimed that after the Colombians surrendered their firearms, the Peruvians began killing the indigenous people around Urbano Gutierrez's settlement.

España also declared that after killing twenty-five people, Normand's group herded the elderly people into the canoes the Colombians had brought, once in the middle of the river, all of the people that were loaded onto the canoes were shot. Afterwards, España stated, the heads of children were rammed down into holes that were dug for the support beams of a house. Westerman Leavine reported that he saw at least one child killed this way. The Colombians, along with several indigenous prisoners, were marched to Matanzas by the group of Peruvians. According to España, four indigenous people, including one chief that was taken prisoner during this event, were "clubbed to death" a short distance from the settlement of Matanzas. (Note: The information in Las Crueldades en el Putumayo y en el Caqueta stated that these people were killed by a garrote instead of being "clubbed to death" as stated in The Devil's Paradise.) Leavine stated that while he did not witness the killing of these four natives, he had heard of this incident around the time it had occurred. Leavine's deposition to Casement in 1910 corroborated most of España's statement. Eight of the Colombian prisoners were taken to La Chorrera and later they were abandoned on a canoe by employees of Arana's firm while in transit to Iquitos, near the Peruvian border with Brazil. Felipe Cabrera, Jose de la Paz Gutiérrez and Aquiléo Torres were kept as prisoners and imprisoned by members of Arana's company with the intention of pressuring them into employment.

Westerman Leavine and Genaro Caporo both gave information relating to the murder of three elderly people and their two adult daughters in the middle of 1907. Normand personally killed these five people and their bodies were eaten by the dogs he trained. Leavine also witnessed other crimes to which Caporo testified on. In one instance, a native chief was burnt alive in front of his wife and two children because he was not able to collect enough rubber to satisfy Normand. The wife was then beheaded, the children were killed, and their bodies were thrown into a fire. Leavine and Caporo also witnessed Normand murder a woman because she refused to be the concubine of an employee. Caporo stated that Normand cut the legs off of this woman and abandoned her for a day and a night in a field before returning to this scene and executing the woman with a Mauser revolver. Normand wrapped another woman in a kerosene-soaked Peruvian flag and set her on fire; she was then shot, Caporo stated she had previously suffered one hundred whip lashes.

Near the end of Caporo's deposition, he declared "[t]o terminate with this repugnant criminal, whom I have seen commit crimes so horrible that perhaps they are unequalled in the history of the entire world, it is sufficient to say that I have seen him repeatedly snatch tender children from their mothers’ arms, and, grasping them by the feet, smash their heads to pieces against the trunks of trees." Normand was also implicated with "dashing out the brains of children" by Westerman Leavine and a Peruvian engineer employed with the Peruvian Amazon Company. According to Leavine, over the course of six years, he saw Normand kill "many hundreds" of indigenous people, including women and children. This did not include the many indirect killings that were caused by starvation, exposure, and the demanding job of collecting and delivering rubber.

The Barbadian Frederick Bishop told Casement that the elderly Andoque people, "all Normand could get hold of", had been killed long before 1910. Both Casement and judge Paredes elucidate the targeting of the elderly indigenous population. Casement believed this was largely due to the fact that the elderly population was capable of giving younger people "bad advice. Bad advice means not to work rubber. Thus the old folks are always first singled out." Paredes cited the attitude of local Peruvian Amazon Company agents towards the elderly, the former regarded the latter as people who could not produce rubber "[h]ence, considering the elderly not only useless but dangerous, they were exterminated to the point of not leaving a single one in the vast and populous region of Putumayo." (Note: Within the deposition of Ildefonso Fachin, Normand is quoted as saying that the elderly were "useless for work.") Fachin, One of Paredes's deponents, claimed that Westerman Leavine was the main executor of Normand's orders regarding the indigenous elderly people and that Leavine was responsible for beheading many of them.

Normand abducted an indigenous woman whom he named Teresa and during this abduction he murdered three other people, including Teresa's mother-in-law. Teresa's husband, Doñecoy Andoques, testified to this and said that his wife's original name was Paccicañate. Normand also had Doñecoy and his father interred in the cepo, and the father of Doñecoy died as a result of Normand's abuse. Doñecoy was imprisoned for three months in the cepo, and upon his release Normand threatened to kill Doñecoy, like his parents, if he tried to care for Paccicañate. Normand later whipped and assaulted Paccicañate, who he forced into becoming one of his concubines. She died the following day from his violence. (Note: The Barbadian Donald Francis witnessed this incident and reported it along with the killing of Isolina, Guiguije, and several other murders perpetrated by Normand in his deposition to judge Paredes in 1911. Francis estimated that there were 200 people killed at Matanzas during his employment at the station, which was a year and nine months.) There were multiple witnesses to this incident, including Pablo Andoques, Lincoln Andoques, Caruso Muinane, and Daniel Alban, all of whom reported this information to judge Paredes in 1911. Daniel Alban and Pablo Andoques both reported that Teresa was a victim of Normand's jealousy, and that Normand flogged her as well as had chili peppers spread on her genitals. (Note: Ciriaco Saldana was the only deponent to report that Normand had spread chili peppers, reduced to a paste, on Isolina's genitals during her murder. Ciriaco may have confused the incident where Isolina was murdered, with the killing of Teresa / Paccicañate. Daniel Alban, Jorge Muinane, Donald Francis and Pablo Andoques reported to Paredes that chili peppers were used on Paccicañate.) The location of her corpse was the first crime scene investigated by Paredes and his commission, the existence of a bonfire as well as charred human bones were identified there. Experts could not determine the age or sex of the deceased person due to extensive damage caused by fire. This location was specified as the location of Teresa's remains by Fachin and three of Normand's muchachos de confianza, all of whom claimed to have witnessed Teresa's killing. (Note: Those muchachos de confianza were Pablo Andoques, Roosevelt Andoques and Antonio Boras.)

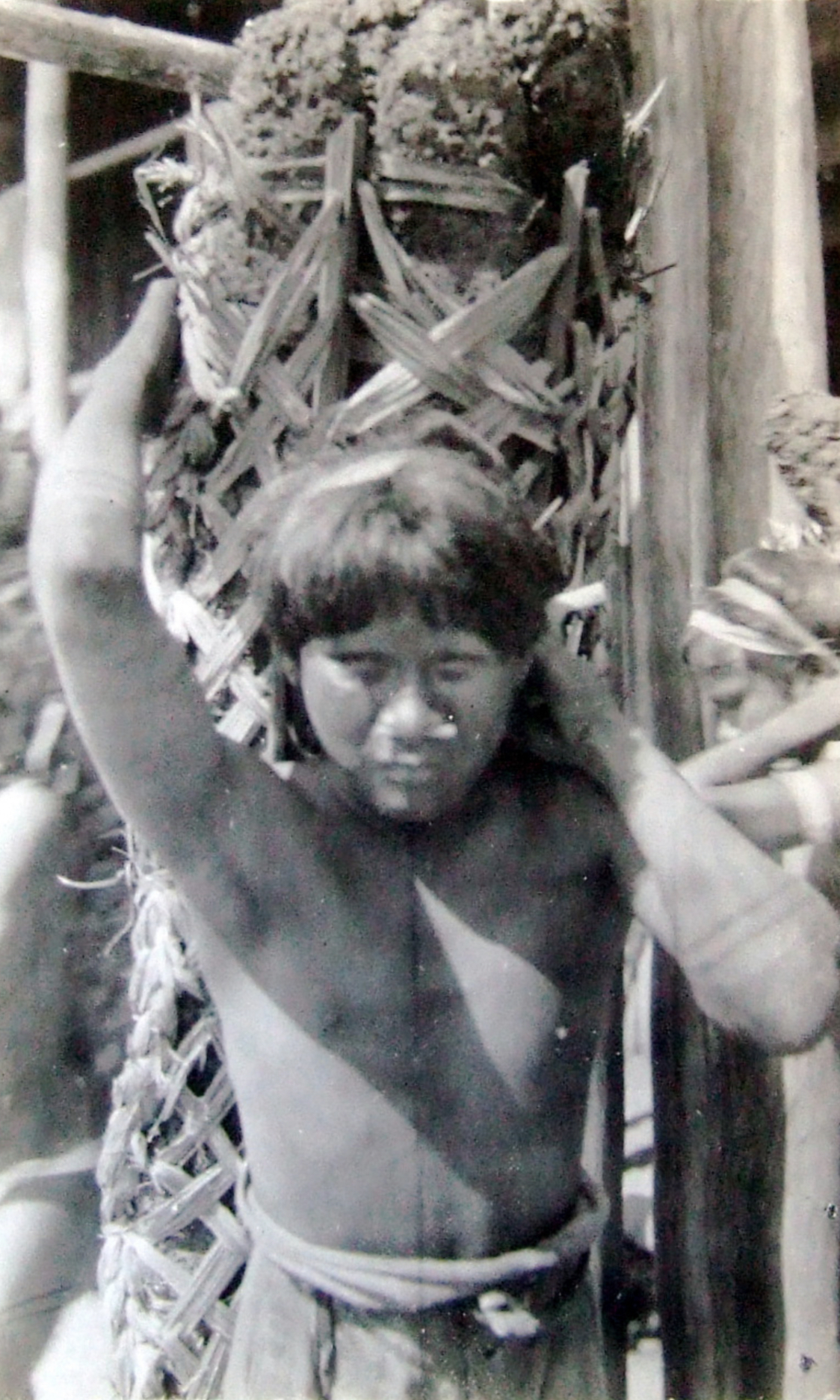
An indigenous youth carrying a load of rubber, either from the Matanzas or Entre Rios station.

Chiache o Zoy, the sister of Paccicañate, was also forced to become a concubine for Normand and later provided a testimony to judge Paredes in 1911. Chiache claimed that Normand forced Chiache to undergo two separate abortions, and during her deposition to Paredes, Chiache emphasized that one of these babies was already well developed. The deponents Dorotea Witoto and Roosevelt Andoques cite the forced abortions undergone by Chiache, to support their claim that Normand forced his indigenous concubines to have abortions. Roosevelt cited the case of another woman named Yjá to support his claim. Another one of Normand's indigenous concubines, named Zoila Erazo, provided an oral testimony in 1980, some of which is based on her experience with Normand. In her testimony, Erazo described how Normand had threatened her and forced her to have an abortion. (Note: Roosevelt stated that this was because Normand did not want to have children with indigenous women,)

Chiache stated that Normand abused her because he had feelings of jealousy, and on one occasion Normand had her placed in chains. Chiache claimed that Normand had ordered the decapitation of numerous women on the route between La China and Matanzas because these women became tired of walking. She also stated that Normand personally killed, and had ordered his subordinates to kill, the children of women he captured so that they would not slow down Normand's group on the return journey to Matanzas or La China. Chiache testified that these killings were carried out in a variety of methods ranging from decapitation, strangulation, and by swords. In her deposition, she provided the names of several of these children killed by Normand or his subordinates. Chiache also reported several other instances of murder perpetrated by Normand, or on his orders, including the killing of Chiache's aunt by one of Normand's muchachos de confianza. (Note: This killing was carried out by a muchacho named Caifás. Normand later killed Caifás because he believed Caifás wanted to kill him.)At the end of her deposition, she stated that Normand had cut the ring fingers off of two people for not meeting the demanded quota of rubber, and when Normand left the Putumayo he took three of Chiache's sisters with him, and two young girls that were unrelated to Chiache.

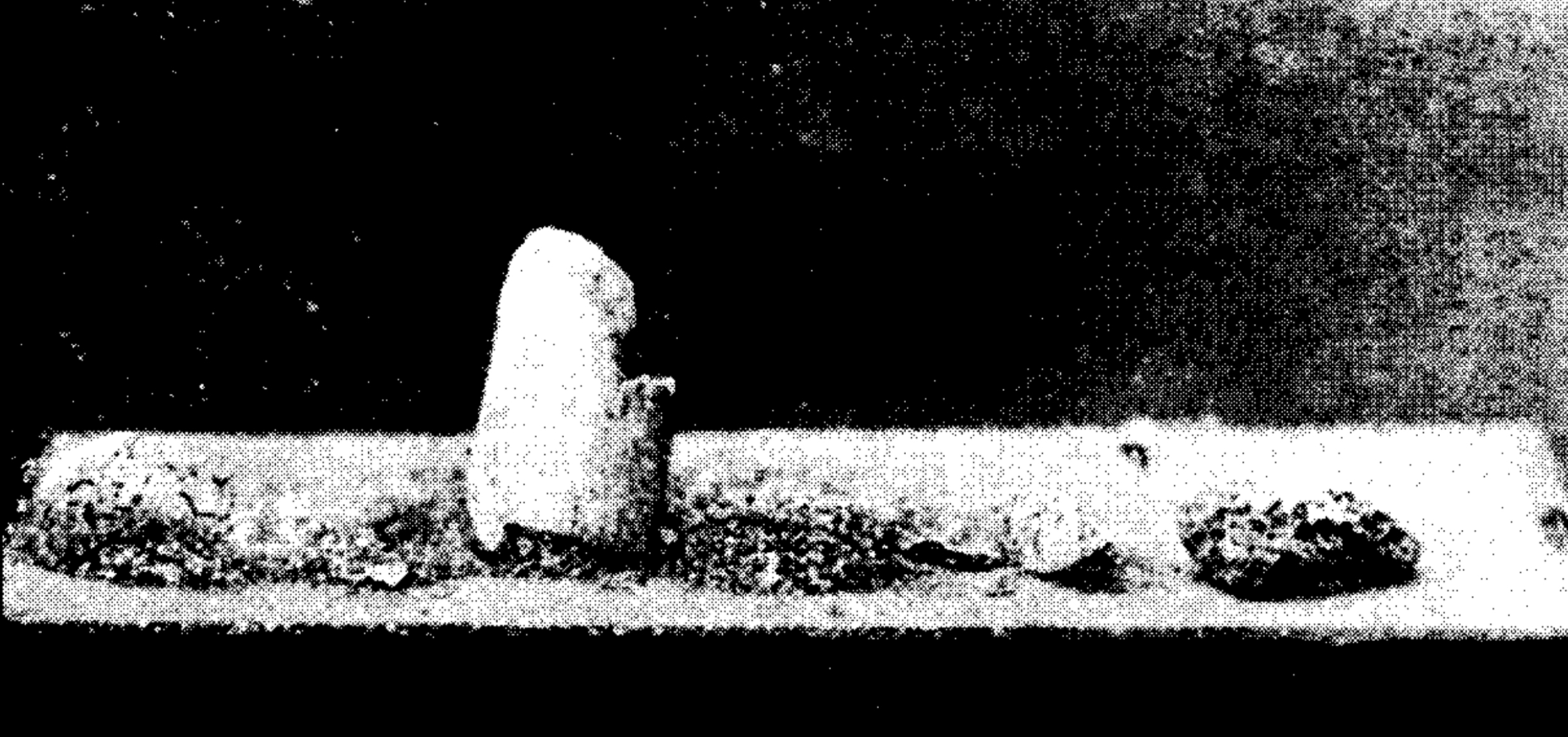
Charred bones of Paccicañate or Teresa, murdered by Normand

There were multiple witnesses to the murder of an indigenous woman named Isolina, who was given to Normand as a concubine by Andrés O'Donnell as a gift of friendship. Carlos Seminario and several other deponents stated Normand killed Isolina over jealousy of an employee named Blondel. After allowing Blondel to sleep with Isolina, Normand had her hanged and whipped, and Isolina died of her wounds. (Note: The 1911 deponents Donald Francis, Ciriaco Saldana Juan Sifuentes, Carlos Seminario, and Adolfo Lopez claimed that Normand had Isolina killed because of his jealousy.) When Adolfo Lopez gave an account of Normand's crimes to Victor Macedo, the manager of La Chorrera, Macedo transferred him to Santa Catalina, which was managed by Aurelio Rodriguez.

Normand had a native chief named Tojá put in chains and executed, then killed Tojá's wife Pandica with a machete; ten other women were killed by Normand's muchachos de confianza in the same manner on Normand's orders because they attempted to run away. It was reported Normand amputated the arms and legs of a chief who refused to tell Normand the location of other indigenous people who had fled. Casement did not name this chief in his report (Note: Casement wrote that he "learned of more than one case of the kind, and have no doubt of the truth of the accusation...") however Valcarcel named other chiefs whom Normand killed with a machete, including Chief Jañigandoy and five others. He amputated the arms and legs of other indigenous people, leaving them to die of the resulting blood loss. One Barbadian named Clifford Quentin came forward, stating he saw one chief killed this way because the chief had not got his people to extract rubber for Normand. Quentin told Casement he had decapitated at least three indigenous people at the behest of Normand. He also reported a massacre perpetrated by Normand at an indigenous inhabitation. Quentin deposition stated:

[T]here were women and men and young children; they were left alive in the house to die there, but their mothers were killed. He cut off the heads of all these Indians; Señor Normand himself did it. He said: "Those were to pay for the white people they had killed."

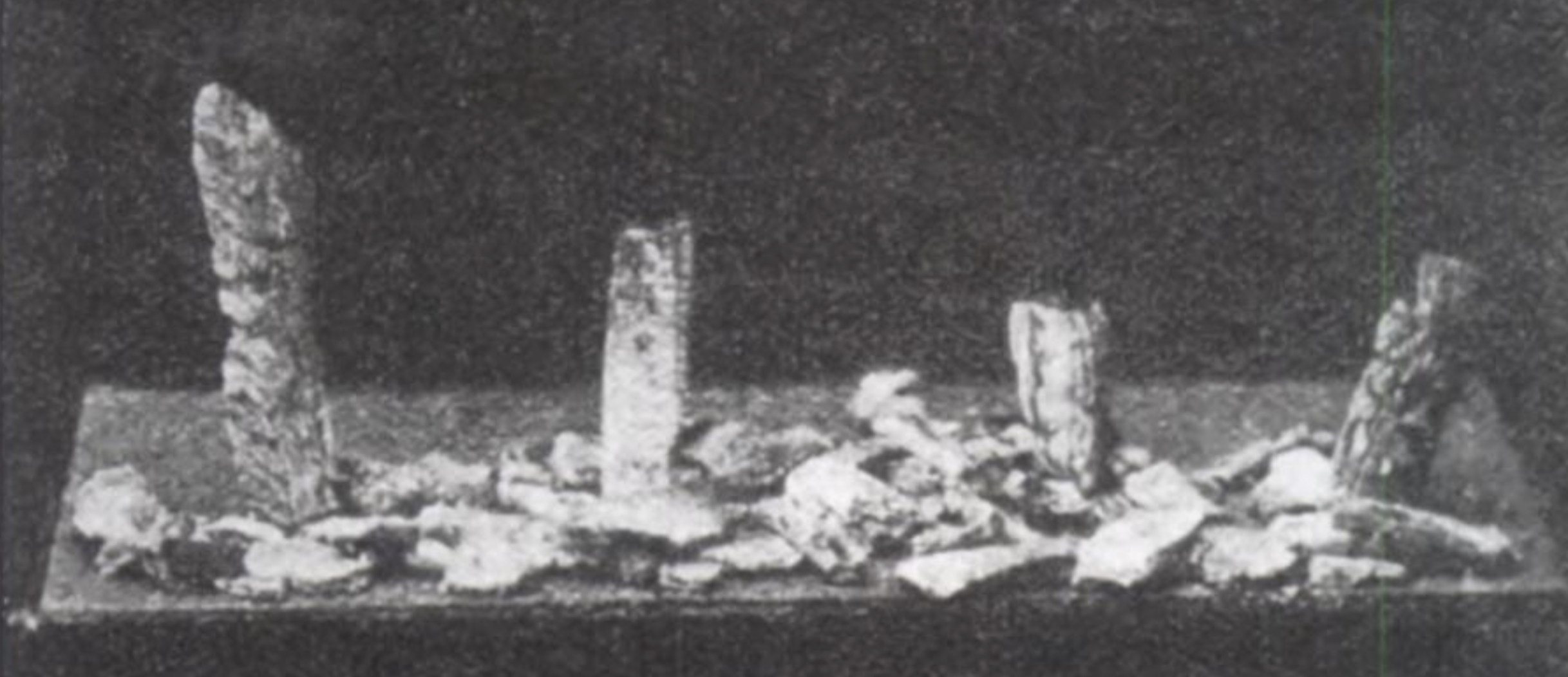
"Charred bones of the Jeiviche and Cadañeineco Indians burned alive by Normand"

Normand murdered the chiefs named Jemajegaina, Chemeje, Cadanecoja, and Jiticupa because they did not bring their people to work rubber. The corpses of those chiefs, except for Chemeje's, were burnt. He also murdered chiefs Toocue and Pichijup for not inducing their people to work rubber. Valcárcel named of some of Normand's victims who died from flagellation and torture. One witness knew about the deaths of Ursechino, Cajecoy, Agocoboa, who were flogged and left to die in the stockade. One deponent claimed that he saw Normand kill the son of chief Napa and with ten other indigenous people because they tried to run away. Hardenburg reports instances of kerosene being poured on men and women before they were immolated. Valcarcel's report mentions the immolation of a native named Jañaique.

Judge Carlos A. Valcarcel found evidence that Normand personally flogged, imprisoned, and starved to death at least four indigenous people. (Note: These people were named Queschefó, Jolé, Cadanellaje and Pacpadefachi. Pacpadefachi was the brother Tojá.) Valcarcel charged Normand with the destruction of the Cadanechajá, Japaja, Cadanache, Coigaro, Rosecomema, Tomecagaro, Aduije, and Tichuina nations. Paredes stated that at Matanzas, Normand imprisoned nearly 1,000 of the local indigenous people, they eventually died from excessive whipping, time in the stocks, and starvation. According to Casement:

Dr Paredes declares that he himself certified to the murder of no less than 1,000 people in the actual station house of Andokes or Matanzas - Normand's headquarters. This in no wise represented all the massacres perpetrated by that monster or his section, but only the deaths that Dr. Paredes became convinced of as having taken place in close proximity to the house itself. The bones he says he found in heaps - some in the bed of a stream - others in a deep pit that had been dug to receive them when it was known that I might visit Andokes - and others lined the paths through the forest in certain directions ... The crimes he attributes to Normand are worse even than I realised. He adds, too, that the outraging of children, of even very small children, was frequently practised by these men and that these innocent victims of this atrocious lust were killed or died from the effects of outrages committed upon them.

== Arrest and disappearance ==
Armando Normand was officially dismissed from the Peruvian Amazon Company on 14 February 1911 along with ten other employees who were implicated in the perpetration of atrocities against the indigenous population. (Note: Abelardo Aguero, Jose Inocente Fonseca, Alfredo Montt, Fidel Velarde, and Augusto Jiménez were a part of this group that was dismissed.) The Prefect of Iquitos sent a telegraph to the Peruvian Minister of Foreign Affairs which stated this group of men had fled towards Brazil. On 29 June 1911, 215 arrest warrants were issued against employees of La Chorrera's agency, including Normand. There were three sets of arrest warrants issued against employees of the Peruvian Amazon Company. Normand was included with the second set, which was ordered by judge Romulo Paredes, and they were "charged with a multiplicity of murders and tortures all through that region".

In December 1911, a Barbadian reported to Casement he had seen Normand and Victor Macedo, together in Manaus, along with several other men who were implicated in crimes in the Putumayo region. The Barbadian informed Casement he thought this group was going towards the Acre territory in Brazil. (Note: In September of 1911, Herbert Spencer Dicky, who had been in the Putumayo for 14 months and was referred to Casement as trustworthy, told Casement that Normand was most likely at Mendoza in Argentina. Casement relayed this information to the English consul-general in Lima, who subsequently asked the Peruvian Minister of Foreign Affairs for his government to pursue the extradition of Normand from Argentina.) Normand claimed that upon learning about Roger Casement's report and its contents, he wrote a letter to the Minister of Justice in Lima, "denying one and all of the charges". Shortly after, he received an order of arrest and extradition to Peru, and the authorities sent him to Guadeloupe Gaol in Lima.

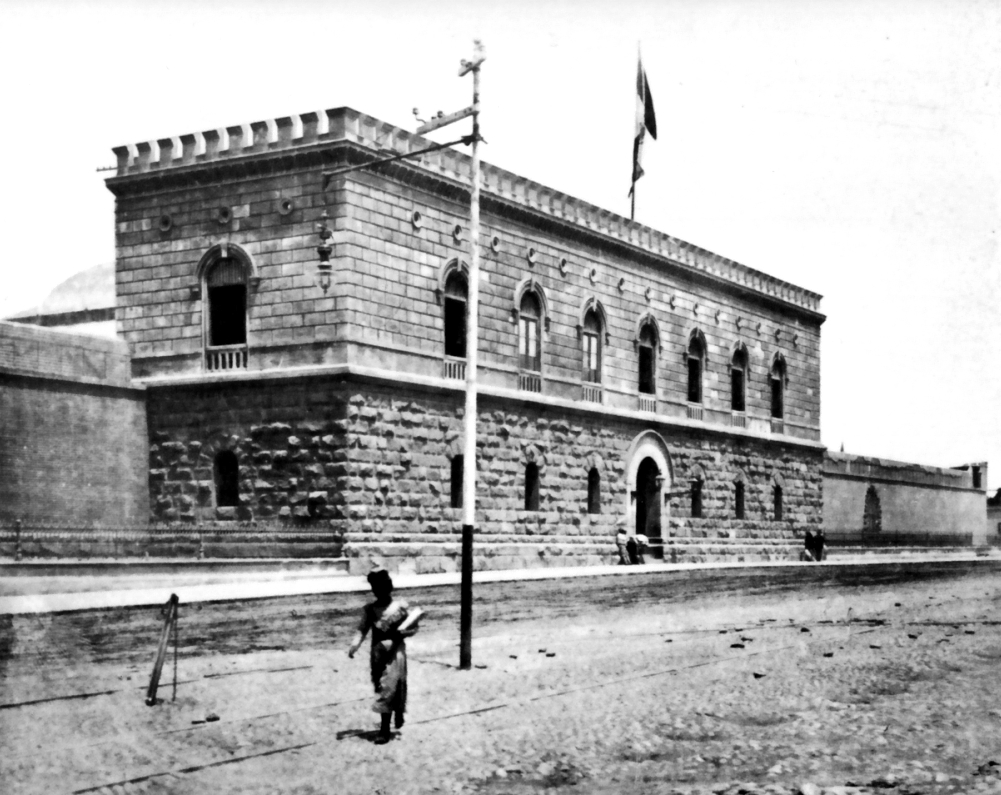
Penitenciaria de Lima - 1875

In an interview conducted in 1913 by Peter Macqueen at Guadalupe Gaol, Normand detailed his life up to that point. He claimed that once he left the Putumayo River basin, he travelled to Manaus, then to Buenos Aires, Valparaíso and then Antofagasta, while there, he said that he sold Panama hats for two years Normand stated that he returned to his home town of Cochabamba sometime around December 1912, he also specified that "I always traveled under my own name." For a time, he made a living by selling horses from Chile while he was in Cochabamba. Near the end of May in 1913, the Sydney Morning Press ran an article titled "Arrest of Armando Normand", highlighting an announcement that the Bolivian police had transferred Normand into the custody of Peruvian authorities. Normand was transferred from prison at Lima to the prison of Iquitos, the British consul-general at Iquitos announced that Normand arrived at Iquitos in custody on October 3 of 1913. In an unpublished book titled El Putumayo y la Justicia, judge Paredes wrote:

Armando Normand, leaves that town (Lima) and arrives in Iquitos after a more or less comfortable trip, loaded down, overwhelmed with letters of recommendation for the authorities and magistrates, letters that are shown here [Iquitos] and bear the most respectable signatures of high-ranking figures in politics, the army, banking and the legal profession... A whole suitcase full of letters of recommendation in favor of a prisoner of that stature."

During his incarceration, Normand sent at least two letters to The West Coast Leader paper, further refuting the crimes that Roger Casement had implicated him with. (Note: El Proceso del Putumayo y sus secretos inauditos noted that Normand denied that either he or any other Peruvian Amazon Company employee had committed any crime. The author wrote "even assuming that no crimes had been committed in the 'Andoques' section, there would always be reason to accuse Normand of not having told the truth in the aforementioned memorial, if the crimes committed in other sections are taken into consideration." The "aforementioned memorial" refers to an essay published by the Peruvian Amazon Company in 1907, signed by Normand and many other prominent employees, in refutal of Benjamin Saldaña Rocca's articles.) In 1915 it was reported Normand had escaped from prison and fled to Brazil with other henchmen of Arana. (Note: Around the time of Casement's trial in London, the New York Herald published an article which claimed: "[i]n the escape of these prisoners evidences of German intrigue, with Sir Roger as the guiding genius were apparent.") Historian John Hemming wrote that "[a]ppeals and counter-appeals delayed proceedings until May of 1915, just before a verdict against them, Normand, Aurelio Rodriguez and another were allowed to escape from jail." There are no historical traces of Armando Normand after that.

== Legacy ==
Robin Furneaux, author of The Amazon: the Story of a Great River, wrote that Normand's "letters to the Press after his capture rival Arana's in the fluency and conviction of their lies"

Anthropologist Guillermo Páramo Bonilla constructed one of the first biographical attempts on the Peruvian Amazon Company criminals in his 2023 article "Un monstruo absoluto": Armando Normand y la sublimidad del mal". That title may translate into English as "An absolute monster: Armando Normand and the sublimity of evil." (Note: The first sentence of this article's abstract states: "[a]mong all the characters accused of ghastly crimes in the Putumayo rubber plantations (ca. 1912), none has exceeded the horror and fascination inspired by Armando Normand.") This article examines primary sources relating to Normand's actions between 1904 and 1910 during his time in the Putumayo River basin, the article also compares Normand's character with Adolf Eichmann, the character of Kurtz from Heart of Darkness, and Roger Casement. (Note: Páramo Bonilla believed that due to the fact that no visual record of Normand has ever appeared, he was "simultaneously the rubber tapper most prone to historical reconstruction and the most prone to mythologizing".) In the words of Páramo Bonilla:

In the cases of Normand, Kurtz, or Casement, there was no other ideal or indicator of success other than their own risk: as Arturo Cova summarized it, "I gambled my heart and Violence won it." And that violence became a reason in itself: to win the battle against the jungle by resorting to terror. But even there, there were dramatic distinctions: Joseph Conrad had enough scruples to make Kurtz's last words - the famous "horror, horror" - a genuine act of contrition... Normand, on the other hand, embodied Kurtz (at least for Casement) but did not repent. Not, at least, the mythological Normand. the one who, regardless of what new things we came to know about him, was represented as an "absolute monster," as someone, who, unlike Eichmann, knew perfectly well what he was doing and had no qualms about doing it, because he considered it the only way to stay alive in the midst of chaos. So much so that if anything is clear from his case, is that, beyond the impressive profits that, as in Kurtz's case, his station reported, Normand's objective - or apparently anyone of the other agents in Putumayo - was not so much economic as existential... Certainly what the experience of the rubber ethnocide teaches us, which crystalizes in Armando Normand as a paradigmatic infamous figure, is how the vocation of fear prevailed over any idea of profitability.

== In literature ==
Angus Mitchell, the editor of Roger Casement's diary that was released in 1997, stated the Matanzas station "in a number of respects ... might be compared to the 'inner station' of [Joesph] Conrad's 'Heart of Darkness,' and if there is a single figure that resembles Kurtz in this journal it is Armando Normand".

In The Lords of the Devil's Paradise, Sidney Paternoster compares Normand to Simon Legree, a cruel and sadistic slaver in Harriet Beecher Stowe's novel, Uncle Tom's Cabin. Paternoster wrote: "Legree's acts pale in comparison to those of Armando Normand, and surely if any one in the Putumayo is to be punished this man deserves to be made an example of".

Although Fred Mustard Stewart changes the name, nationality, and location of a character named Jorge Ruiz, who appears in Stewart's 1973 novel The Mannings, the character seems to be inspired by Armando Normand. In the novel, Stewart says Ruiz, an agent at the novel's Oro Blanco rubber station, "could have been a successful accountant in Caracas, but here in the jungle he had become a monster".

== See also ==
- Peruvian Amazon Company
- Putumayo genocide
- Andrés O'Donnell
- Julio César Arana

== Bibliography ==
- Slavery in Peru: Message from the President of the United States Transmitting Report of the Secretary of State, with Accompanying Papers, Concerning the Alleged Existence of Slavery in Peru. United States. Department of State. 1913.
- Casement, Roger (1997). The Amazon Journal of Roger Casement. Anaconda Editions. ISBN 1901990052.
- Casement, Roger (2003). Mitchell, Angus (ed.). Sir Roger Casement's Heart of Darkness: The 1911 Documents. Irish Manuscripts Commission. ISBN 9781874280989.
- Goodman, Jordan (2009). The Devil and Mr. Casement: One Man's Battle for Human Rights in South America's Heart of Darkness. Farrar, Straus and Giroux. ISBN 978-1-84467-334-6.
- Hardenburg, Walter (1912). Transcript of 'The Devil's Paradise. / A catalogue of crime' by W. E. Hardenburg. National Library of Ireland.
- Hardenburg, Walter (1912). The Putumayo, the Devil's Paradise; Travels in the Peruvian Amazon Region and an Account of the Atrocities Committed Upon the Indians Therein. Putumayo: London: Fischer Unwin. ISBN 1372293019.
- Valcárcel, Carlos (2004). El proceso del Putumayo y sus secretos inauditos. The International Work Group for Indigenous Affairs.
- Olarte Camacho, Vicente (1911). Las crueldades en el Putumayo y en el Caquetá. Imprenta Eléctrica.
- Chirif, Alberto (2017). Depues del Caucho. The International Work Group for Indigenous Affairs.
- "The Anti-slavery reporter and aborigines' friend". The Anti-slavery Reporter and Aborigines' Friend. 1–3. 1909–1914.
- Hemming, John (2008). Tree of rivers : the story of the Amazon. London : Thames & Hudson.
