= Aurelio and Arístides Rodríguez =

20th-century Peruvian mass murderers

During the later stages of the Putumayo genocide, the brothers Aurelio and Arístides Rodríguez respectively managed the rubber stations of Santa Catalina and La Sabana, which were located near the Cahuinari River. The rubber collected at these stations was dependent on slave labor from the Huitoto, Boras and Resígaro indigenous populations. Between 1903 and 1907 the Rodríguez brothers were employed by J.C. Arana y Hermanos, which became the Peruvian Amazon Company in 1907, both companies were founded by the Peruvian rubber baron Julio César Arana.

Evidence collected by Walter Ernest Hardenburg, Benjamin Saldaña Rocca, Roger Casement and judge Rómulo Paredes implicated the Rodríguez brothers with the perpetration of various crimes against the local indigenous population, including flagellation, deliberate starvation, rape and murder among other atrocities. In 1910, the general manager of La Chorrera admitted that the Rodríguez brothers "had killed hundreds of natives" during their management of Santa Catalina and La Sabana.

Aurelio and Arístides both retired in 1909 and afterwards they travelled to Europe. Arístides perished on June 18 of 1910. Aurelio was arrested for his role in the Putumayo genocide in 1911 along with several of his subordinates, however Pablo Zumaeta arranged to bail Aurelio out with a payment of £2,000. Aurelio escaped from prison at Iquitos in May of 1915 with Armando Normand prior to a verdict in their trial.

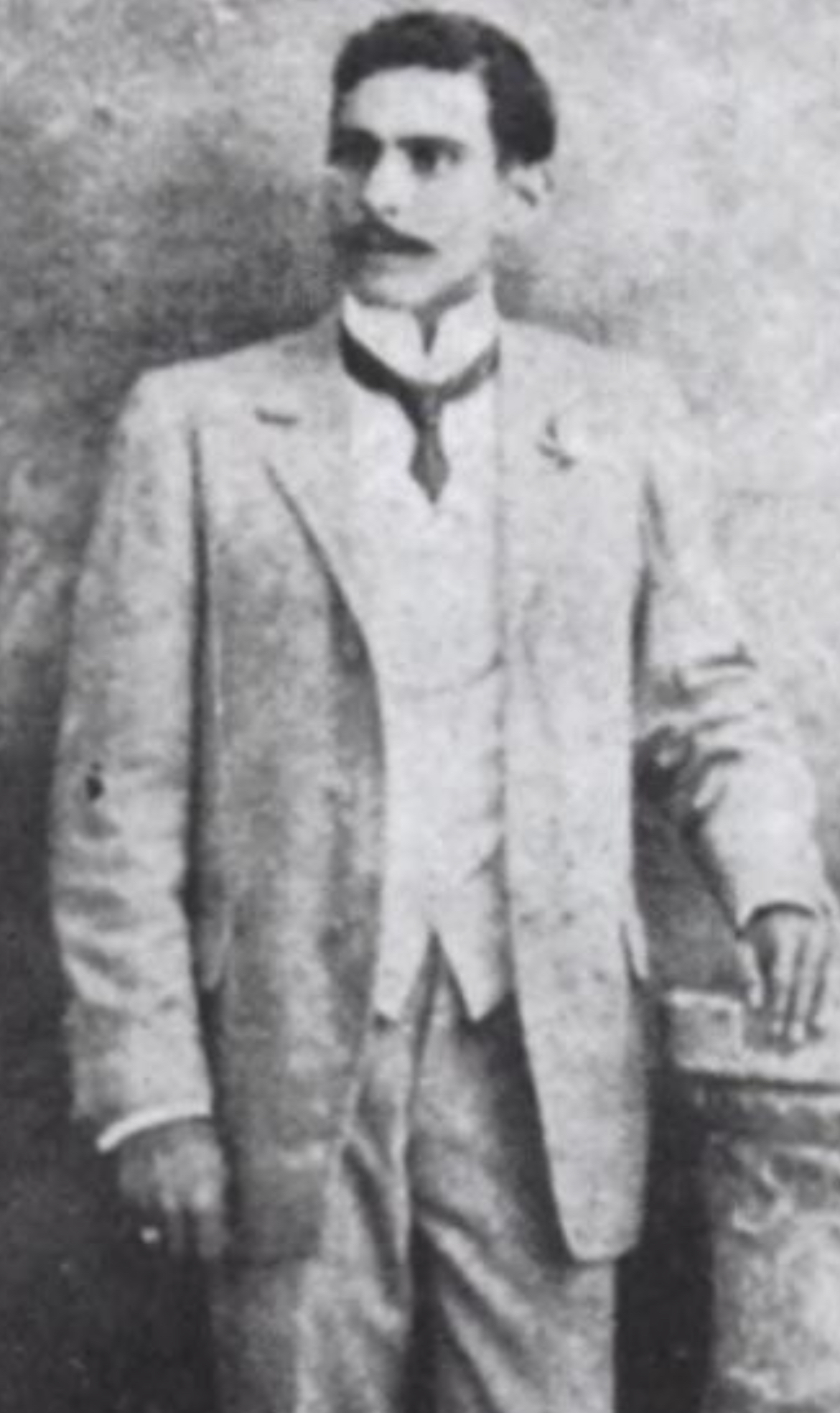
Aurelio Rodriguez, manager of Santa Catalina, a rubber plantation

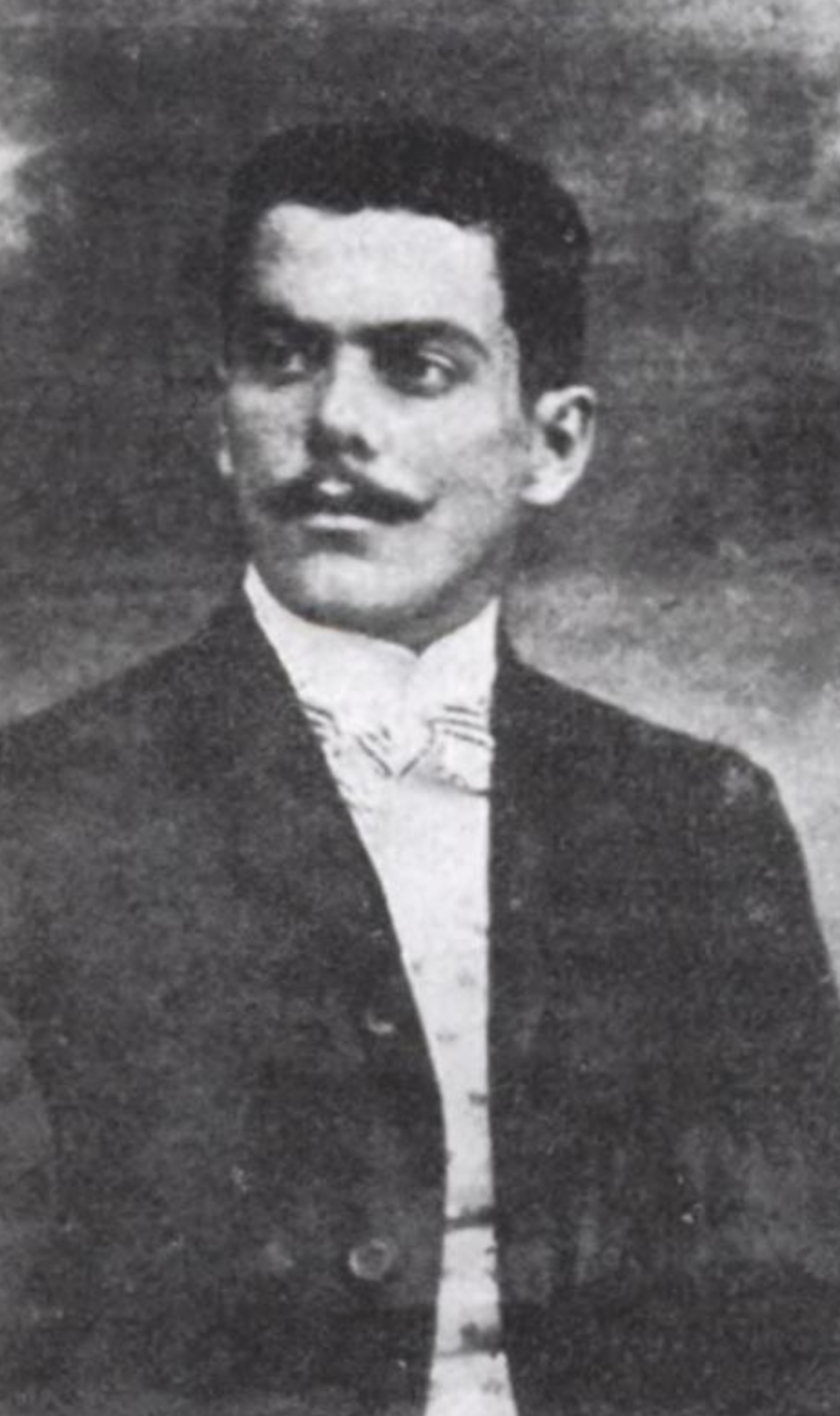
Aristides Rodriguez, manager of La Sabana, a Peruvian Amazon Company plantation

== Early life ==
The little bit of public information regarding the early life of Aurelio and Arístides Rodríguez comes from Walter Ernest Hardenburg. Hardenburg wrote:

"Both of these copper-complexioned monsters were formerly barefooted peons of Chachapoyas, Peru. Going to the Putumayo, they began their career of butchery, and by dint of continual crime have succeeded in amassing a small fortune."

== Career ==
Aurelio and Arístides were employed in the Putumayo River basin by Larrañaga, Arana y compañia at La Chorrera as early as 1903. The Rodríguez brothers wrote several letters during this time period which would later implicate them with crime in the region. They were referred to as "chiefs of sections" by April of 1904. Arístides reported and denounced the massacre of enslaved Ocaina rubber extractors that occurred in La Chorrera in 1903. He singled out the manager Victor Macedo as the first promotor and distributor of these killings. Macedo and another witness of these killings would later implicate the Rodríguez brothers with participating in the massacre.

Between 1903-1909 the Rodríguez brothers managed the stations of Santa Catalina and La Sabana which were part of La Chorrera's agency. While writing about La Sabana and Santa Catalina, Casement clarified that: "[b]oth these stations lie in the Boras country, La Sabana actually on the Cahuinari River, and Santa Catalina not far from it."

The judge which investigated crime in the agency of La Chorrera, Rómulo Paredes, noted that the payment through commission to managers of Arana's company encouraged these managers to terrorize the indigenous people to maximize their income. This was most notably the case with the Rodriguez brothers, whose contract stipulated that they would receive 50% of the profits from rubber their stations brought in. During the end of a rubber collection period, known as a fabrico, the Rodríguez brothers typically demanded a quota of five arrobas, which was 75 kilos or 165 pounds. (Note: The last deponent that appears on the chapter for Santa Catalina and La Sabana in El Proceso, Manuel Quevedo, noted that the indigenous people at Santa Catalina were flogged for not delivering a designated amount of rubber on a date designated by the station's manager.)

== Role in the Putumayo genocide ==
Benjamin Saldaña Rocca, Walter Hardenburg, Roger Casement and Rómulo Paredes all investigated the Putumayo genocide and they collected evidence for Rodríguez brothers involvement in crime. Saldaña Rocca was the first person to publicly denounce Aurelio and Arístides in his publication La Felpa. Hardenburg later collected several depositions that incriminated managers of the Peruvian Amazon Company, including the Rodríguez brothers, with horrendous crimes. Hardenburg published twenty of these statements in 1912, at least four of those statements implicated the Rodríguez brothers with murder and other crimes. Casement interviewed several Barbadians in 1910 which were subordinate to the Rodríguez brothers and these Barbadians reported multiple crimes perpetrated by Aurelio and Arístides. Paredes collected multiple depositions in 1911, along with letters and physical evidence which further implicated the Rodríguez brothers in multiple atrocities, perpetrated against the enslaved indigenous population subordinate to their stations.

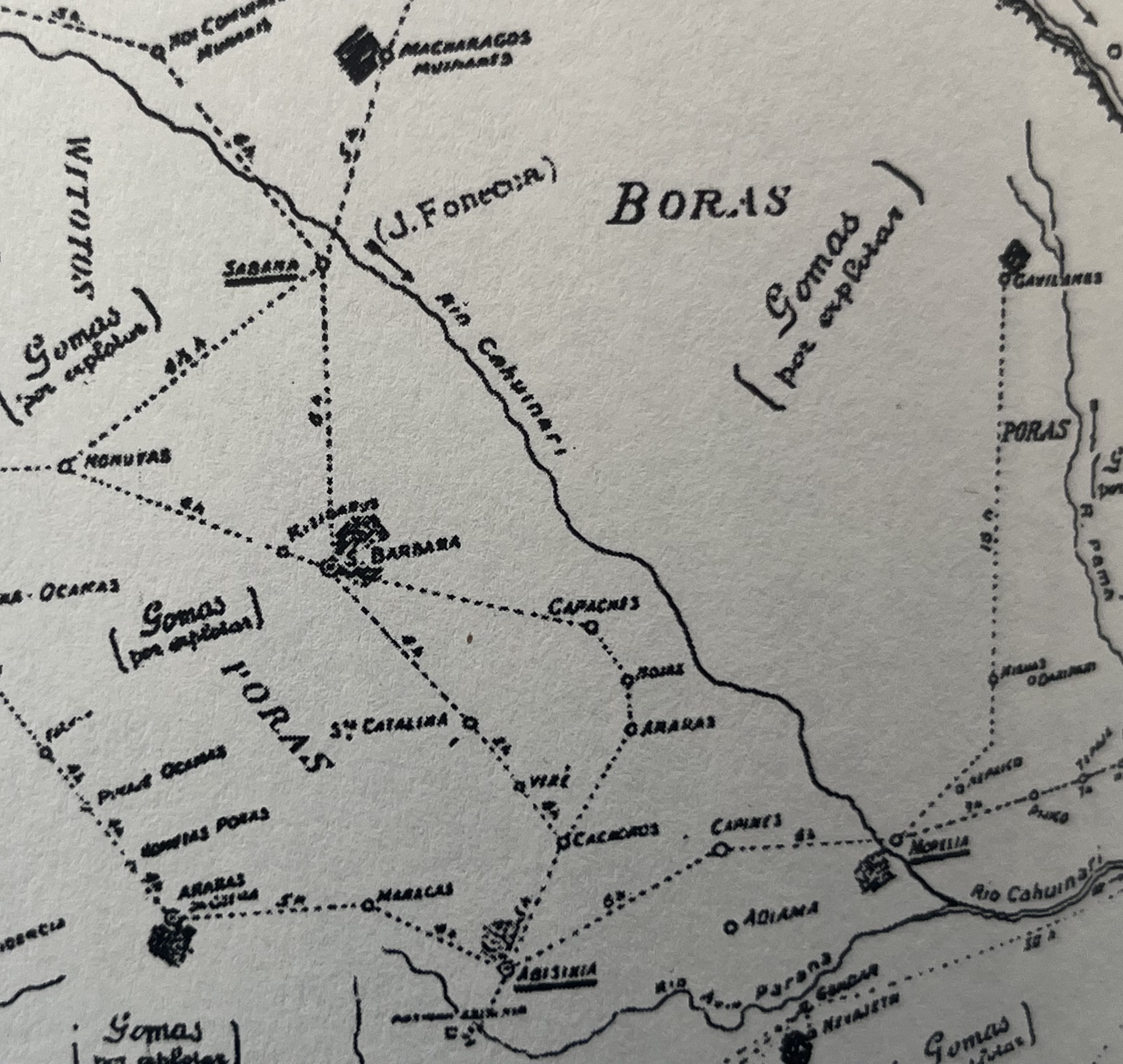
Map of J.C Arana y Hermanos territory on the Lower Cahuinari

Near the end of his investigation, Casement wrote: "Moreover, hundreds of crimes not recorded there have taken place. Normand, Aguero, Fonseca, Montt, Jimenez, the two Rodriguez brothers and Martinengui, have between them, murdered several thousand of these unhappy beings. There is no doubt of it. Tizon admitted to me in Chorrera last week that the two Rodriguez 'had killed hundreds of natives', and that Arana gave them 50% of the produce of these two sections, S. Catalina and Sabana."

=== Letters as evidence of crime ===
Judge Rómulo Paredes emphasized that the most compelling evidence of crime in the region came from letters and statements exchanged by agents of the company to coordinate attacks against indigenous people. Paredes collected at least three letters that implicated the Rodriguez brothers with such actions against the local population near their rubber stations. One letter, dated March 1, 1903 was signed by the Rodríguez brothers and detailed an ambush against Resígaro people. Rodríguez's group managed to secure a carbine and a shotgun from a Resígaro house. Two widowed indigenous women were given to Miguel Flores and an agent named Almeida, the custody of the surviving group of Resígaro people was also given to these two agents. A separate letter which provided further evidence of crime, relayed that at La Sabana, Coquero and Unuda, two indigenous captains, were given four hundred whip lashes, members of their tribe were given one hundred whip lashes. Coquero and Unuda perished from their flogging while Arístides reported he was under the belief that their tribe "will work" in the extraction of rubber. (Note: Ildefonso Fachin claimed that the Rodriguez brothers captured Coquero, Unuda and their tribes, they were taken to La Sabana and "cruelly whipped". Coquero, Unuda and their wives died from flagellation, many of the members from their tribe also perished from their wounds after they were released from imprisonment. Fachin claimed that during his six months at La Sabana he witnessed daily flagellations.)

Another letter dated April 4, 1903 was sent by the Rodríguez brothers to Juan Bautista Vega, this letter detailed an assault against a Guivira maloca. At the time of the attack, the Guivira natives were hosting a "great dance" which was attended by members of Unuda's as well as Coquero's tribe, Riñonigaros, Machagaros, Muinanes, and "a large number of Andoques".

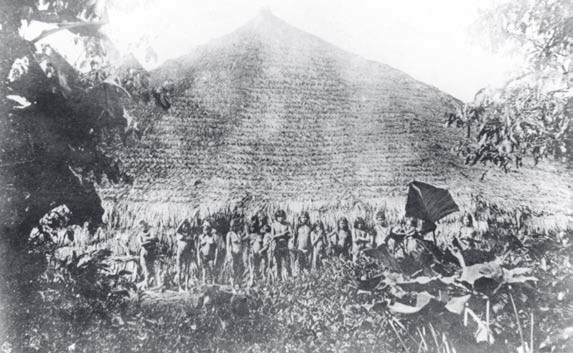
Eugène Robuchon - Región del Cahuinarí. Indios huitotos nonuyas delante de su choza

The letter claimed that the indigenous people had invited nearby rubber tappers to join the dance however the Rodríguez brothers wrote that they were under the impression that they would be murdered in their sleep, like Emilio Gutiérrez and his employees were that same year. The assault against the Guivira maloca lasted around fifteen minutes and more than eighty natives were killed. Two Machagaros natives approached the station of La Sabana and told the agents there that Andoque people were burning Machagaro houses because Rodríguez's subordinates forced a Machagaro captain to serve as a guide in the attack against the Guivira maloca. The writer claimed that he saw smoke from fire around various areas on the opposite side of the Cahuinari from La Sabana.

=== The Hardenburg and Saldaña depositions ===
The Rodríguez brothers were included in the original criminal complaint filed by Benjamin Saldaña Rocca to the court of Iquitos. This complaint requested for authorities to arrest the Rodríguez brothers along with sixteen other employees of J.C. Arana y Hermanos for their perpetration of crime in the Putumayo River basin. On January 5 1908, Saldaña Rocca published a letter from an ex-employee of Arana's company named Marcial Gorries, which denounced the Rodríguez brothers and other managers as the "principal criminals" on the Putumayo River. Gorries emphasized "every one of them—have killed with their own hands".

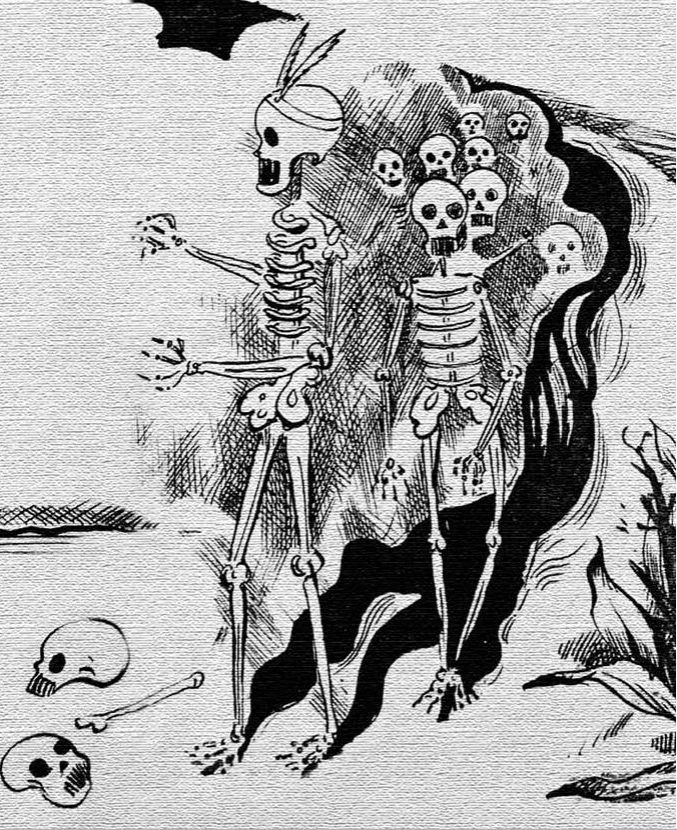
Skeletons, an image published by Benjamin Saldaña Rocca

Juan Rosas, an ex-employee of J.C. Arana y Hermanos and a correspondent of Walter Ernest Hardenburg, reported the perpetration of several crimes he witnessed while employed at Santa Catalina in 1904. Rosas claimed Aurelio sent out Correrias to hunt down indigenous people which were fleeing from the "cruel punishment given them, as those who unfortunately fell into the hands of this chief were killed in a most barbarous manner." According to Rosas, one of these correrías, consisting of ten armed men, murdered numerous indigenous people they encountered on their journey. (Note: "and committed the most savage outrages, killing all the poor infieles, big and small, that they met on their march.") This group returned with around forty indigenous prisoners which were interred in the cepo at Santa Catalina. Rosas claimed that after this group of prisoners became sick with smallpox, Aurelio took them outside "one by one, and used them as targets to practise shooting at." Aurelio ordered the execution of another indigenous women around nine days later because she also became ill with smallpox.

Genaro Caporo reported that Aristides ordered five of his subordinates to murder four Recígaros natives because they arrived to La Sabana without rubber. Shortly after this incident, Aristides led an expedition of around fifty armed men towards the Cahuinari River. According to Caporo, Aristides and his group murdered around one hundred and fifty indigenous people, including men, women, as well as children. (Note: Genaro wrote: "In these houses there were at least forty families, according to an individual who accompanied Rodríguez, who went in first to ascertain what Indians there were inside. Here a most horrible spectacle was witnessed, and it was appalling to hear the groans and laments of the Indians enwrapped in the devouring flames of the fire.") Twenty days after that incident, Aristides shot and killed four Muinane people he met while enroute to Santa Catalina. Caporo wrote that in March of 1908 a commission arrived at Santa Catalina with four indigenous prisoners. These prisoners were used as target practice by Aurelio Rodriguez, he killed them and had their corpses burned.

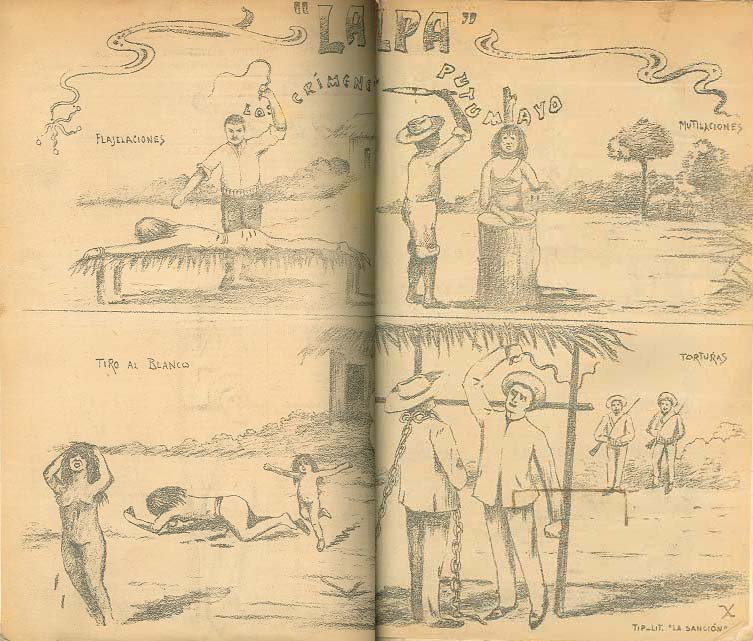
Illustration on the first issue of 'LA FELPA'

Daniel Collantes wrote a deposition that was sworn before a public notary, he claimed that on May 24 1908, Aurelio ordered Alejandro Vasquez Torres to take nine agents with him and capture an indigenous woman and "kill her in the cruellest way possible." Collantes described the murder of this woman in his deposition, some which was edited out of The Putumayo, The Devil's Paradise due the nature of this crime. (Note: The complete description of this crime is included in the unpublished version of Hardenburg's manuscript, which is digitally accessible through the National Library of Ireland's website.)

=== The Rodríguez brothers and Casement's investigation ===
The Barbadian Frederick Bishop told Roger Casement that Arístides was paid 7,000 Peruvian soles by Fidel Velarde for the rights to manage La Sabana. According to Bishop, Fidel was encouraged by the fact that La Sabana had delivered 30,000 kilos of rubber to La Chorrera in a single fabrico and Fidel was under the impression that he would have similar success at La Sabana.

Edward Crichlow and Evelyn Batson described the "double cepo" in their depositions to Casement. Batson knew this device was constructed by Crichlow and he witnessed the imprisonment of children with the "double cepo" as well as the flagellation of children while interred there. This device employed at Santa Catalina as late as May of 1908. Casement described the double cepo in his 1910 report, he wrote:

"Not satisfied with the ordinary stocks to detain an individual by the legs alone, [Aurelio] Rodriguez had designed a double 'cepo' in two parts, so formed as to hold the neck and arms at one end and to confine the ankles at the other. These stocks were so constructed that the leg end could be moved up or down, so that they might fit an individual of any size. For a full-grown man they could be extended to the length of his figure, or contracted to fit the stature of quite a child. Small boys were often inserted into this receptacle face downward, and they, as well as grown up people, women equally with men, were flogged while extended in this posture."

— Roger Casement, Slavery in Peru

Augustus Walcott stated that he saw around twenty natives murdered, men women and children, they were shot and beheaded. Walcott stated that Aurelio gave directions to his subordinates to cut off the arms and legs of one indigenous man, who was around twenty four years old, because he had attempted to flee the area and he had killed a Muchacho de Confianza in the process. Walcott testified that after this mans limbs were cut off, he was burned alive, Batson was sure this man was alive because his eyes moved and he screamed during the process.

Batson also stated that he saw women flogged at Santa Catalina and he claimed this was because their husbands did not come to the station with enough rubber to meet the established quota, or they did not arrive with rubber at all. Indigenous women at Santa Catalina were required to work in the extraction of rubber. Batson stated that during his employment at Santa Catalina, indigenous were expected to collect 150 to 200 kilograms of rubber per year and there were three fabricos, or collection periods, every year.

While Batson stated he did not know of natives perishing from flagellation at Santa Catalina, he testified that he buried several natives who died on the road home after they suffered flagellation at Santa Catalina. (Note: "I had to make a hole to bury them, and I could see that they had died from the flogging.") Batson stated that he witnessed Aurelio shoot indigenous people, "a good many of them", with his revolver and that Aurelio ordered his muchachos to decapitate his victims. Batson only knew of one Barbadian decapitating an indigenous person at Santa Catalina; he stated that this was Clifford Quintin near the end of 1907. Quintin was ordered to carry this out because the native man did not work or deliver rubber. in Quintin's statement, Rodolfo Rodriguez ordered Quintin to decapitate this native, who had run away and killed a muchacho. Rodolfo threatened that he would bring Quintin to Aurelio Rodriguez to administer a punishment for refusing to carry out Rodolfo's orders and when Quintin protested further Rodolfo threatened to kill him with a rifle. (Note: Rodolfo Rodriguez is referred to as a Colombian at Santa Catalina, he was implicated with many instances of murder.)

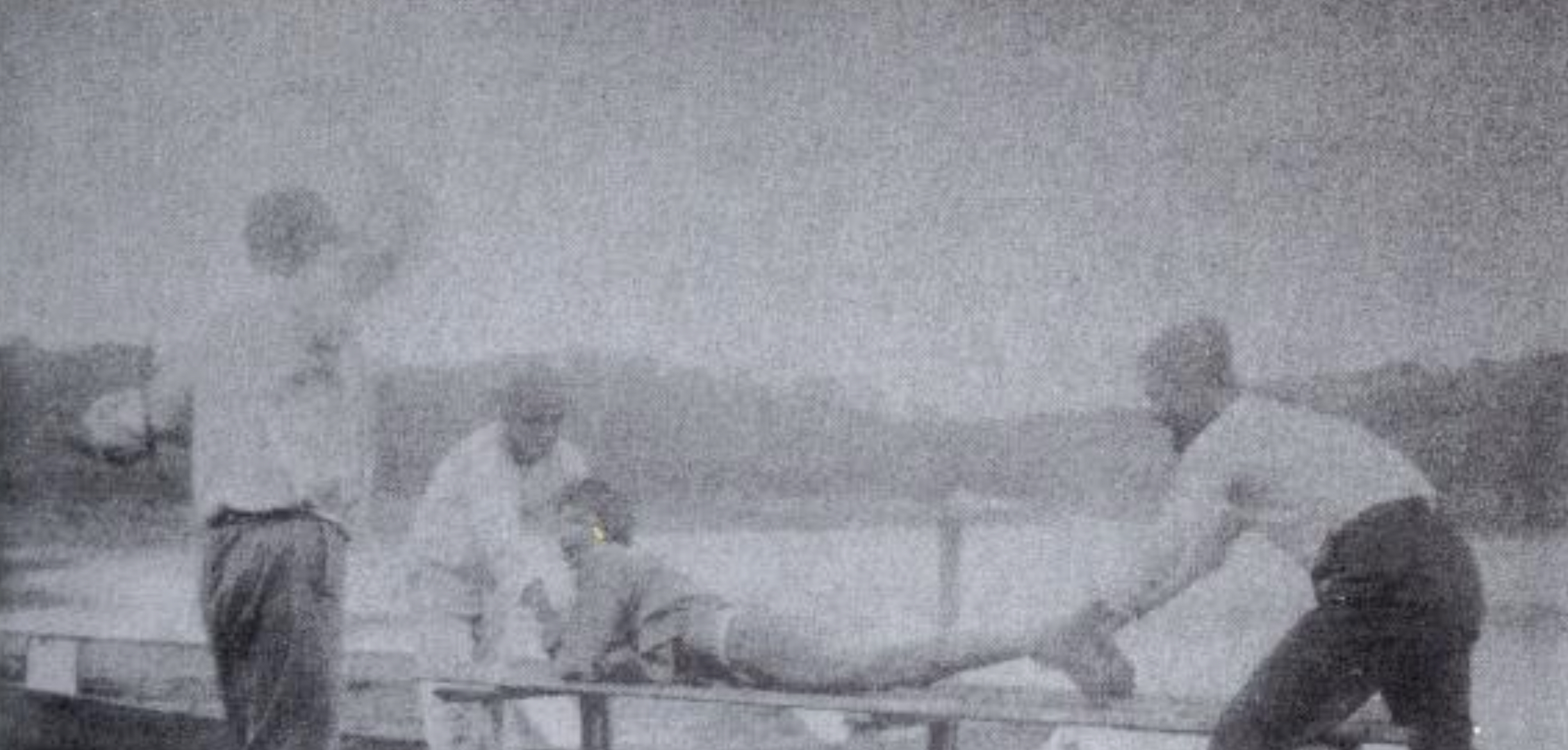
Flogging of a Putumayo native, carried out by the employees of Julio César Arana

Crichlow claimed that during a small quarrel "of no importance" between himself and a white agent of the Peruvian Amazon Company, Rodriguez took the latter's side and struck Crichlow on his head with a revolver. Crichlow was beaten by Rodriguez's subordinates and then imprisoned the cepo until the following day. He was transported to La Sabana with a chain around his neck and an armed guard. La Sabana was managed by Fidel Velarde at the time. Velarde had Crichlow emplaced at that stations cepo, he was released the cepo the next day and sent to La Chorrera for further imprisonment. Evelyn Batson corroborated Crichlow's testimony regarding his physical abuse at Santa Catalina.

Evelyn Batson was employed on correrias with Aurelio Rodriguez. reston Johnson was employed at Santa Catalina for 18 months, during which he oversaw the transportation of rubber, the flagellation of indigenous people and he was also employed on correrías near the station. P Johnson was later transferred to La Sabana, he was employed there until 1910 with the same tasks as the former station. Clifford Quintin was sent to Santa Catalina around February of 1907, he was employed "on commissions and hunting Indians" as well as flogging natives while under Aurelio's management. Quintin claimed that "very many Indians were killed there both by [Aurelio] Rodriguez himself and by his 'muchachos'"

When Casement asked Johnson rather or not he knew of natives dying from starvation, Johnson's reply was "in Sabana plenty have so died in the time of Arístides Rodríguez, the brother of Aurelio Rodríguez, but that he does not know if they so died in Santa Catalina." (Note: Johnson's deposition as transcribed by Casement states: "The Indians, he declares, were killed for not working rubber - for running away in order to escape from this work. Some may like to work rubber, but others do not, and these latter are not asked if they like to work rubber, but are chased and killed.")

Johnson claimed that the entrapped natives were mostly killed by the muchachos de confianza and he only saw one instance of a white agent murdering a native. Johnson never witnessed Aurelio kill a native person during his employment at La Sabana however "very many were killed by his orders and their heads were cut off by his orders." These orders were carried out by the muchachos de confianza and affected men, women as well as children. When Casement asked Johnson how many killings of indigenous people he had witnessed at Santa Catalina, Johnson stated there was "a great many" and the majority of these people "were killed for trying to run away." (Note: Casement wrote: "Dr. Paredes declares that some of the sections, notably those of the Rodriguez Brothers and Normand are so sown with human remains as to resemble battlefields.")

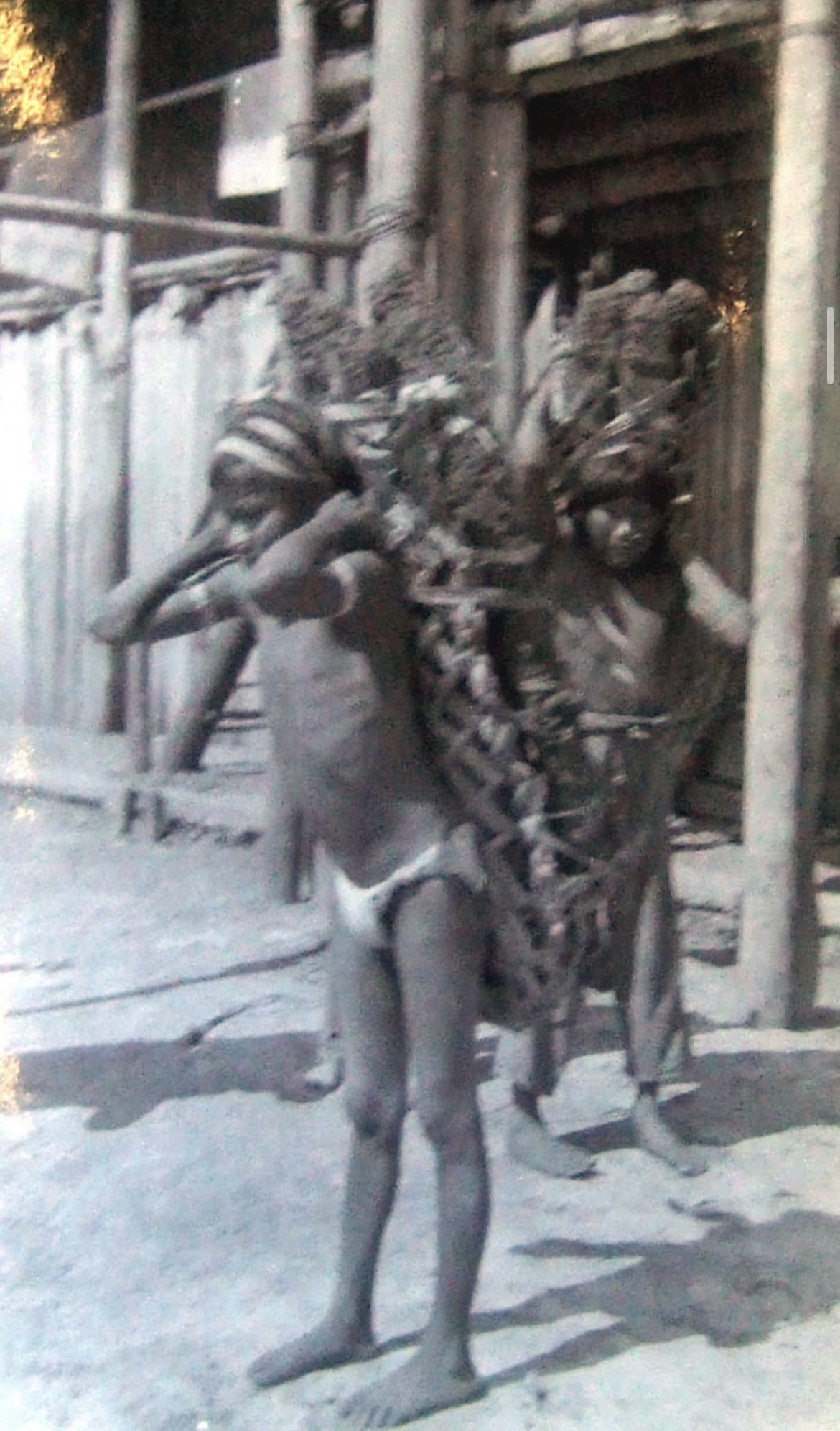
An indigenous youth carrying a load of rubber in the Putumayo

John Brown was sent from Abisinia to Santa Catalina on numerous occasions in order to aid Aurelio Rodriguez's correrías, which were frequently organized according to Brown. Brown testified that he "frequently saw Aurelio Rodriguez and his conduct to the Indians was the same as [Abelardo] Agüero's." Brown reported that on one occasion, Aurelio resided at an indigenous house for ten days and expeditions to hunt down natives were sent into the surrounding forest daily. Rodriguez ordered for the natives that he did not desire to take for his workforce to be decapitated. Brown stated that Santa Catalina and Abisinia would aid each other and exchange agents when extra manpower was desired, that these two stations were separated by a distance that could take two days to traverse. Casement wrote:

"The murdering of the natives between Santa Catalina and Abisinia by orders of Agüero and Rodriguez went on all the time of his [Brown's] stay in the region."

=== 1911 depositions incriminating the Rodríguez brothers ===
[T]he evidence about the massacres of Indians carried out by the chiefs of the sections La Sabana and Santa Catalina and their subordinates in the raids carried out by said chiefs is not only constituted by statements and letters, but also by material evidence about these massacres, such as the recognition by empirical experts of one hundred skulls of Indians murdered in one of them, as we have seen. (Note: José Maria Boras, a muchacho de confianza that participated in correrías between Abisinia and La Sabana, led empirical experts to the remains of a house that was the site of a massacre. Empirical experts found a "multitude of human bones" and more than one hundred human skulls were identified at the site.)

— Rómulo Paredes, El Proceso del Putumayo y sus secretos inauditos

==== The correría to avenge Bonificiao ====
Bonifacio was a muchacho de Confianza of Aristides at La Sabana. According to Agustin Peña, Bonifacio was transporting merchandize when he was killed, and this merchandize was stolen by his killers. Several depositions provided to judge Paredes claimed that Arístides organized a correria as retaliation for Bonifacio's death. (Note: Homero Rodriguez, brother of Aurelio and Arístides Rodríguez, told judge Paredes that he knew a correría was carried out in 1906 and another correría was organized by Arístides to avenge the death of Bonifacio. Santiago Portocarrero, Carlos Quinto Nonuya, Toribio Gonzalez and Justo Lopez also claimed that Arístides organized a correría as revenge for the death of Bonifacio.) (Note: Santiago Portocarrero provided a deposition while in prison at Iquitos, he claimed that he was aware Arístides had participated in a correría along with Fidel Velarde and Abelardo Aguero. During this correría more than one hundred indigenous people were murdered. Portocarrero stated that he was informed about this correria from members that participated in it.) Two deponents clarified that the correría began on February 5, 1907. (Note: These two deponents were Justo Lopez and Ciriaco Saldaña.)

Alejandro Vasquez stated that he only took part in one correría across the Cahuinari River and he was deceived about the expeditions objective: the Rodriguez brothers stated that this raid was intended to attract the Boras nation to extract rubber for Santa Catalina. Vasquez claimed that one hundred people took part in this raid and they were divided into three groups, one of which was led by Justo Lopez while the other two groups were led by Manuel Vargas and Luis Armando Blondel. Vasquez Torres claimed that he protested the killing of indigenous people during this expedition because he was not given the orders to do so, however he was told by Justo Lopez that it was the Rodriguez brothers that had sanctioned the extermination of these natives because they killed the muchacho named Bonifacio.

Manuel R. Vargas provided a deposition while imprisoned at Iquitos, he stated that Arístides organized a correría and in writing ordered Vargas to place himself at the disposal of Aurelio. Vargas travelled with a group of armed agents towards the Cahuinari River's center, they surrounded a maloca in that area and an unspecified number of indigenous people were killed while several escaped. The next day this group attacked another maloca which was preparing to host a dance, Vargas claimed that he saw around twenty corpses in the aftermath of the assault. In his deposition, Justo Lopez not clarify the number of indigenous people killed during this expedition however he stated that a single indigenous child was taken prisoner at the first maloca that was encountered. (Note: Lopez claimed that he protested the killing of indigenous people by this group and he travelled back to Santa Catalina. The next day members of this correría also returned to Santa Catalina. The agents Bucelli and Armando Blondel told Aurelio that this expedition was unsuccessful due to Lopez's cowardice.)

Ciriaco Saldaña was part of the group led by Manuel Vargas, he stated that three days after leaving Sabana the expedition encountered an indigenous house where people were dancing at the time. Eighteen indigenous people were shot and killed there. According to Ciriaco, this group had killed twenty-five women who were travelling to this house. After these killings, the expedition travelled to the maloca of captain Katenere and they killed more than forty indigenous people here. Ciriaco's information was corroborated by Toribio Gonzalez, another participant of this correría. (Note: Toribio Gonzalez claimed that twenty-five women were killed by Justo Lopez's group, this group later arrived at a Maloca while indigenous people were dancing, all of those people were killed. Lopez's group then travelled to captain Katenere's group and murdered forty indigenous people.) Ciriaco stated that these massacres were "very profitable" for the Rodríguez brothers because the terrified indigenous people delivered "up to forty kilos of rubber each and every month after them."

According to Adolfo Lopez, this correría lasted twenty days, using machetes and firearms the expedition killed almost every indigenous person they came across. The members of the correría carried out their attack on the maloca hosting a dance by surrounding that settlement and ambushing the inhabitants. Lopez claimed he was informed by members of that correría that there were three hundred indigenous people killed by this group. Lopez claimed that "Aurelio Rodriguez had the habit of cutting off the heads of the Indians even before they had finished dying." Agustin Peña also admitted that he participated in this correría: he claimed that one hundred and sixty indigenous people were killed during this raid and members of the correría looted the indigenous settlements.

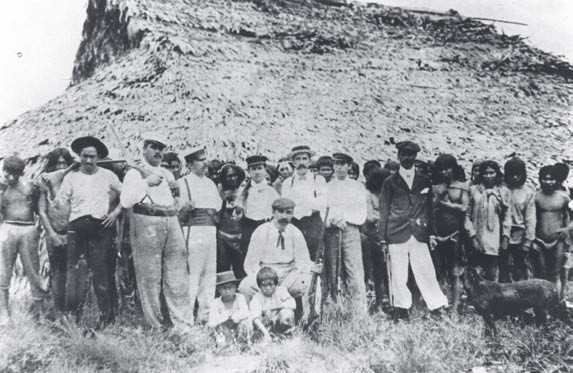
Eugène Robuchon - "On the march towards the Huitotos"

Froilan Patino provided an eyewitness account for the correría led by the Rodriguez brothers, Fidel Velarde, Miguel Flores, Abelardo Aguero and Augusto Jimenez. Patino stated that after two days of travel while on a correría with the Rodríguez brothers, Fidel Velarde, Miguel Flores and Aguero this group encountered several natives. Two children were grabbed and smashed against a tree trunk, which killed them, an elderly woman was also murdered by this group. One of these corpses was given to two muchachos from the Muinane and Nonuya nations and they were given orders by the leaders of this expedition to consume the corpse. Patino stated that this expedition captured five indigenous women, these women were given to muchachos of the Nonuya tribe and the previously mentioned managers ordered those captives to be cannibalized, an order which was carried out.

According to Carlos Quinto Nonuya, Arístides, along with at least eight other agents attacked the maloca of an indigenous captain named Quimaji, during this attack around forty indigenous people were killed, including men, women and children. Six indigenous women were captured by this group and the agents ordered for Nonuya natives to cannibalize those women, three of which were eaten according to Carlos.

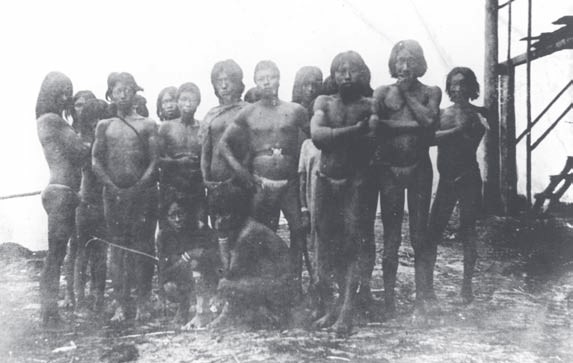
Eugène Robuchon - Indios huitotos nonuyas

Paredes emphasized that one of the primary accusations levied against the Putumayo's indigenous people was that they were cannibals. (Note: "It is the central argument of the rubber tappers and their defenders to justify their civilizing role.") Paredes absolutely refuted these allegations, he wrote that "[t]he only case of cannibalism I became acquainted with during my mission in the Putumayo, was that ordered by the civilized themselves." Paredes noted that if there were truly instances of indigenous people willingly cannibalizing foreign settlers in the Putumayo then he would have been informed about it since he "made an effort to prove cases of cannibalism". With the exception of the cases instigated by Aurelio and Abelardo Aguero, none of the people questioned by Paredes in the region could confirm a single case of cannibalism. (Note: "The Indians accepted the spoils given with repugnance, they pretended eating for fear of threats and punishment, and with skill they got rid of the stew.")

This station [Abisinia] and the preceding one (Santa Catalina) were the chief centres of the bloody raids against the Boras tribe, from which it may be gathered how many slaughters took place. These huntings of the Indians (correrias), which should also be called these infamous expeditions ('comisiones'), which set out to spread terror and death among the unhappy savages had no other object save destruction.

— Rómulo Paredes, Précis of the report of Dr. Rómulo Paredes

==== The killing of Carlota and Rosaura ====
Adolfo Lopez and Ocaña both testified to the killing of Carlota, Alejandro Vasquez's indigenous concubine. Aurelio originally ordered Lopez to execute Carlota however a muchacho de confianza executed this order instead since Lopez refused to do so. Ocaña claimed that Aurelio gave a carbine to a muchacho and then told this muchacho to shoot Carlota because she had physical relations with an indigenous man.

Justo Lopez stated that he had an indigenous wife named Rosaura and that she fled from Santa Catalina while pregnant, however Lopez did not provide any information regarding her death. In their depositions, Hipólito Medina and Carlos Qunito Nonuya provided information regarding the killing of Rosaura.

Alejandro Vasquez Torres estimated that during his employment at Santa Catalina he witnessed the flagellation of two hundred indigenous people, which was carried out by Aurelio, his subordinate agent and his muchachos de confianza. Vasquez claimed that one day he went to investigate a commotion caused by screaming and Vasquez saw Aurelio and a Barbadian man flogging an indigenous woman named Lola. Vasquez stated that he intervened and requested to take Lola as his concubine so that Aurelio would not kill her and afterwards Aurelio had a grudge against Vasquez. One day when Vasquez was absent from Santa Catalina, Aurelio flogged Carlota, another indigenous concubine of Vasquez's which was pregnant at the time, she was interred in the stations cepo for three days and then killed by machetes on Aurelio's orders, her corpse was cremated. Vasquez raised a complaint with Victor Macedo in regards to the killing of Carlota, Macedo told Vasquez that if he did not like being employed at Santa Catalina then he could move to a different section so Vasquez transferred to the station of Oriente.

==== Murders perpetrated by the Rodríguez brothers ====
Pinedo Rezigaro claimed that he witnessed Arístides murder six indigenous people at La Sabana and he witnessed Aurelio murder two natives at Santa Catalina. Pinedo also knew about the murder of two indigenous people that were killed because they would not work rubber for Aristides and Pinedo reported this to Paredes.

Adolfo Cortez claimed that Aristides ordered four of his muchachos de confianza to murder two natives named Ayeye and Ocaca because they attempted to flee La Sabana. These two natives were shot to death and Cortez estimated that during his employment at La Sabana two hundred natives were flogged by Aristides or his subordinates. Toribio Gonzalez reported that Arístides ordered his muchachos de confianza to execute two natives, named Ayeye and Ocaca, then decapitate them and present their heads to Arístides as proof of these killings.

Gonzalez also claimed that on one occasion he witnessed Aurelio murder more than thirty people at Santa Catalina because they did not meet his demands for rubber. On a separate occasion at La Sabana Gonzalez stated that he saw Arístides murder forty-five indigenous people in a single day. Gonzalez ended his deposition by reporting that Aurelio punished the subordinates that fell asleep while guarding the station at night by burning them with candles and that on one occasion when Gonzalez protested Aurelio's conduct, Aurelio beat him and broke his arm.

Carlos Quinto Nonuya stated that Aurelio frequently organized correrías and during those attacks indigenous people were killed without distinction for their gender or age. Carlos was later imprisoned with Aurelio and Paredes stated that during this time Carlos refused to answer any other questions that the judge raised. Paredes believed that Carlos refused to answer these questions because he was instructed to not reveal any further information regarding crime.

Froilan Patino witnessed Aurelio shoot and wound two natives with a revolver, Aurelio ordered his muchachos to behead those two injured natives. The reason provided by Patino for these murders was that the two victims did not deliver rubber to the station. Patino claimed Aurelio shot another indigenous man in the head with his parlor carbine at Santa Catalina because the indigenous man attempted to flee. Patino described the murder of an indigenous child by Aurelio, this girl had fled Santa Catalina after she was flogged. When Aurelio caught her, she was thrown from the roof of a house onto the ground and afterwards Aurelio beat her to death, this killing was protested by Lucinda Torrejon. The deponent Adolfo Lopez corroborated these last two murders that were reported by Patino.

Hipólito Medina told judge Paredes that he witnessed Aurelio murder three indigenous people with his revolver at Santa Catalina because they did not meet the weight quota of rubber he set. (Note: Rafael Ocaña also testified that he witnessed Aurelio execute three natives for the same reason.) Medina stated that Rodriguez had forced these indigenous people to carry sixty kilograms of rubber across a distance that took four days to traverse, they were given no food for this journey. Medina reported that Aurelio had three "enormous whips" that he used to flog the indigenous people at Santa Catalina. Medina claimed that he witnessed Aurelio murder the captain Capache along with his brother, who was also a captain. Aurelio administered an unspecified number of whip lashes which corresponded to the number of people from their tribe that had fled the area. Medina claimed that Aurelio also authorized his twelve muchachos de confianza "to kill the fleeing Indians wherever they found them; and those muchachos killed countless Indians." Medina also testified that he witnessed Aurelio murder Rosaura, who was pregnant at the time, Medina's deposition also corroborated Adolfo Lopez's and Rafael Ocaña regarding the murder of Carlota. Medina also implicated Aurelio with raping two indigenous children and they perished from this assault according to Medina, Lopez also reported this information to Paredes. Medina noted that those two indigenous girls also suffered from starvation because Aurelio didn't feed them.

Miguel Tapullima provided a deposition to Paredes, he stated that he worked under Aurelio's management for two years. Tapullima reported that he witnessed Aurelio shoot twenty indigenous people in a single day because they did not deliver the amount of rubber he demanded from them. Tapullima also claimed that he witnessed Aurelio murder five indigenous infants "by smashing them against tree trunks", the reason for this was because their mothers would not extract rubber while breastfeeding. On one occasion, Tapullima stated that he saw Aurelio flog around thirty indigenous people, afterwards he ordered his muchachos to murder these victims and then burn their corpses. Along with several other witnesses, Tapullima stated that he witnessed Aurelio shoot and kill the indigenous man named Huallay with a parlor carbine. Tapullima, like Medina, claimed Aurelio raped two indigenous girls at Santa Catalina, both deponents claimed that they "died with rotten genitals." Tapullima also claimed that he knew of five indigenous captains perishing from hunger at Santa Catalina and that fifty indigenous people were murdered at a maloca during a correría organized by the Rodriguez brothers. (Note: Tapullima finished his statement with: "I suppose that in other huts they would kill more.")

Justo Lopez told the judge that Aurelio took two young Boras girls, aged around six and seven, away from their families and forced them to work as "maidservants" at Santa Catalina. Lopez believed that Aurelio had raped these two children because their corpses were found with injury to their genitalia. (Note: Among various other crimes Ocaña accused Justo Lopez with murdering an indigenous captain named Cuhueche as well as the muchachos Arturo, Jimai and Alejandro Muinane, all of which were shot to death at Santa Catalina.)

Miguel Boras testified that Aurelio personally murdered the father, mother and four brothers of Miguel along with an infant girl during a raid against his families maloca. Miguel stated that he was the only survivor of this raid and that Aurelio gave him away "as a gift" to Jose S. Rodriguez, the doctor of La Chorrera.

Ochoa Muinane declared that he witnessed Augustus Walcott, as well as a Barbadian referred to as Collens and two muchachos shoot six indigenous people under Arístides's orders. Ochoa claims that he also witnessed Arístides murder three indigenous people, named Augue, Anemedeca and Bucujé because they did not deliver an amount of rubber deemed satisfactory to Arístides. Paredes judicial commission later found the remains of three burned corpses in an area indicated by Ochoa, who specified that they belonged to Augue, Anemedeca and Bucujé. Empirical experts were unable to determine the gender of these victims because their remains were partially destroyed by fire.

Ochoa Muinane witnessed Arístides personally shoot seven natives, which Ochoa provided the names of, because Arístides was convinced those people wanted to kill him. Ochoa specified that he was a muchacho de confianza under Aurelio and Ochoa estimated that one hundred and fifty indigenous people were murdered personally by Aurelio or by the muchachos de confianza which carried out his orders. Ochoa stated "[t]hese deaths have almost all been carried out with machete and when the victims took too long to die they were finished off with rifle butts." Ochoa provided the names of six other indigenous people that Aurelio had killed because they attempted to flee and avoid extracting rubber. Ochoa did not clarify if he served as a muchacho for Aristides, which he did with Aurelio.

Victor Muinane was a muchacho de confianza under Arístides and he testified to witnessing Arístides murdering six indigenous people on one occasion, Victor provided the names of these victims in his deposition. An agent of the Peruvian Amazon Company named Jeremias Guzmán corroborated Victor's deposition and the remains of six corpses were discovered by Paredes's commission in an area specified by Guzmán and Victor as the scene of this crime. Empirical experts determined that these six corpses belonged to adult males. On a separate incident Arístides murdered seventeen indigenous people, all of which Victor also provided the names of. Victor estimated that he witnessed Aurelio and Aristides Rodriguez, along with seventeen subordinates, murder more than one hundred indigenous people because those indigenous people wanted to kill the former.

Another deponent, named Ricardo Muinane, admitted that he was a muchacho de confianza of Aurelio Rodriguez, whom he saw commit many murders. Ricardo stated that the corpses of these victims were cremated at Santa Catalina's burning pit, referred to as the quemadero.

Ciriaco Saldaña claimed that in 1908 he witnessed Arístides personally murder fourteen indigenous people because they fled from La Sabana's territory and they were attempting to convince other people to not extract rubber. Their corpses were burned, and Ciriaco specified that these people were killed after the indigenous workforce of La Sabana delivered 30,000 kilos of rubber in a single fabrico. Ciriaco stated that "Rodríguez was very concerned about making the remains of his victims and even the ashes of the corpses that he had cremated disappear." (Note: "wholesale murder and torture endured up to the end of Aurelio Rodriguez's service, and the wonder is that any Indians were left in the district at all to continue the tale of rubber working on to 1910." -casement)

==== The use of flagellation and starvation ====
Justo Lopez estimated that he witnessed Aurelio had killed sixty indigenous people through the use of flagellation, the cepo and hunger. Lopez claimed that Aurelio forced women and children near Santa Catalina's territory to work in the extraction of rubber and when they did not partake in that work they were punished with flogging and the cepo, during their imprisonment they were not provided with any food.

Carlos Quinto Nonuya admitted that he was a muchacho de confianza for Aurelio and that he had witnessed Aurelio kill more than two hundred indigenous people through the use of flagellation, the cepo, and hunger. Aurelio sometimes flogged the indigenous people himself while at other times he ordered his subordinate agents and muchachos de confianza to flagellate. Carlos witnessed Aurelio shoot and kill two natives on one occasion as well as Aurelio shooting one indigenous man in the head with a parlor carbine on a separate occasion. This indigenous man was named Huallay and Aurelio killed him because Hullay did not deliver any rubber. Carlos also testified that he witnessed Aurelio throw a young indigenous girl from the highest part of a house to the ground and afterwards Aurelio proceeded to kick her to death. Carlos saw Aurelio murder the wife of Justo Lopez, Rosaura, through flagellation because she had attempted to flee. Carlos also claimed that Aurelio murdered five indigenous captains, which Carlos named, because they did not bring their nations to Santa Catalina to work in the extraction of rubber. Two other indigenous captains were also murdered by Aurelio because they fled from Aurelio back towards their nations. Aurelio had the corpses of these victims burned. Carlos stated that women and children were forced to extract rubber for Santa Catalina and when they did not do so they were punished with around five to twenty whip lashes. (Note: According to Carlos, Aurelio stated that he "did not like white people to see human remains".)

The Barbadian Donald Francis was a subordinate of Aurelio at Santa Catalina for five months, during that time Francis claims that he witnessed Aurelio flog around two hundred people. Francis stated that during those five months, Aurelio had three indigenous concubines at Santa Catalina, and Aurelio frequently went on correrías, during which indigenous people were killed and their settlements were burned. Rosendo Lopez and Ciriaco Saldaña both stated that they witnessed Francis administer two hundred whip lashes to an indigenous women under the orders of Aurelio. Francis admitted to carrying out these orders however he claimed that he only administered fifty whip lashes before protesting any further punishment, several days later this woman perished from the flagellation. Several deponents stated that Donald Francis and three other Barbadians participated in the correría to avenge Bonifiacio however Francis did provide any relevant information regarding this in his deposition. (Note: Miguel Montoya's deposition states that he worked at La Sabana during Arístides management and during this time he witnessed the flagellation of indigenous people, often at the hands of the Barbadians employed at La Sabana. Montoya claimed that these indigenous people were given around thirty to forty lashes from a whip and he did not know if these people had perished from the flagellation.)

Sofia Rezígaro told judge Paredes that Arístides, using whips, flayed her sister named Tigue and she perished from those wounds after she returned to her nation. Arístides also imprisoned Sofia's father for an unspecified amount of time, during which her father was given nothing to eat. Arístides forced Sofia's father to deliver a "heavy load of rubber" from La Sabana to La Chorrera and he perished during this journey. Sofia claimed that Arístides ordered his muchachos de confianza to murder her however an agent named Ismael Portillo intervened by asking Arístides if he could take Sofia as his concubine, which the manager permitted. (Note: Sofia stated that she was later forced to serve as a concubine for Elias Martinengui and then Jose Inocente Fonseca.)

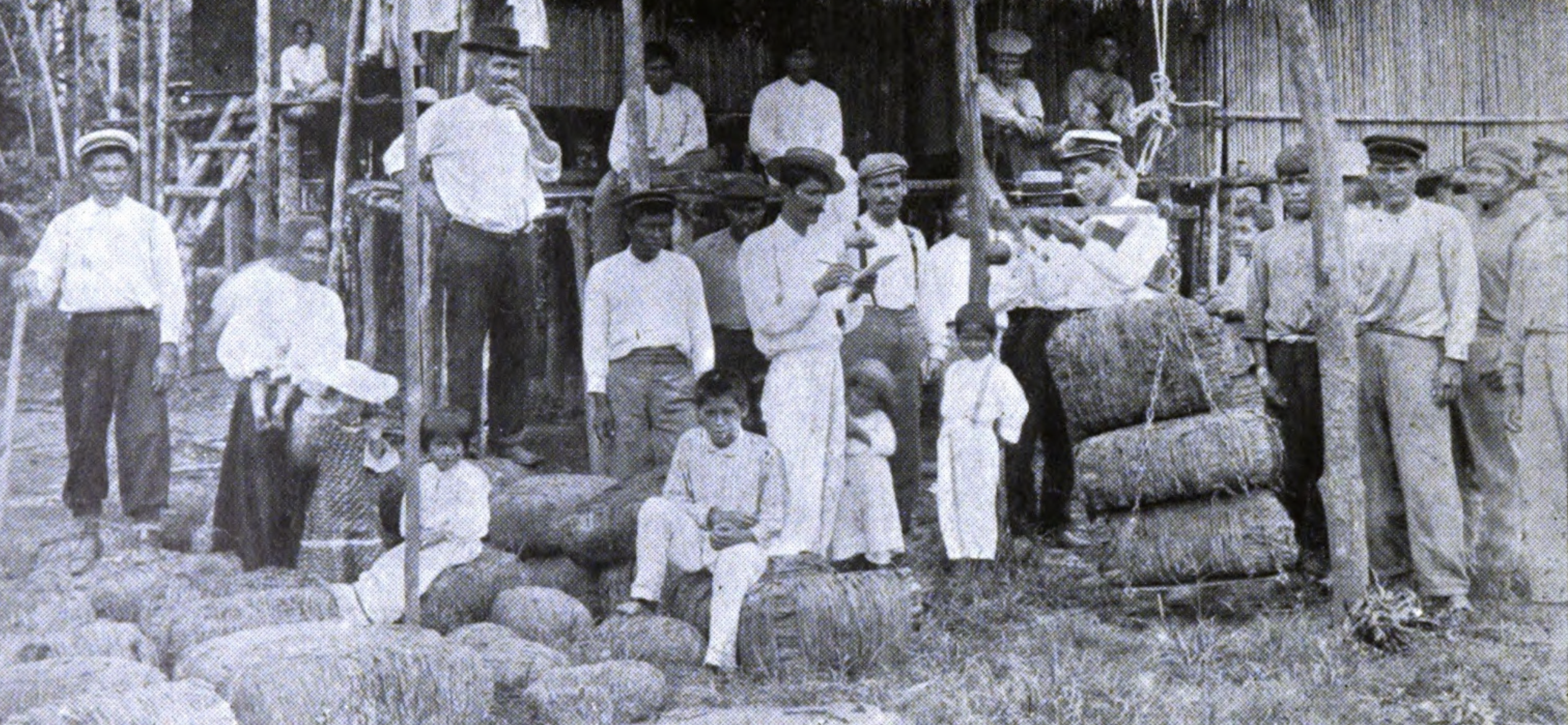
Weighing the rubber

Rosendo Lopez stated that he was employed at La Sabana for six years as a cook and he witnessed many of the crimes perpetrated in that section. Lopez admitted that he took part in a raid organized by the Rodriguez brothers against nearby indigenous people, he estimated that during this raid around one hundred indigenous people were killed. (Note: Lopez claimed that this group did not kill the women or children, however he does not specify rather or not they were imprisoned.)

Glorioso Rodríguez stated that he only worked at La Sabana under Arístides management for a short time, during which he witnessed Arístides murder three indigenous people. These murders took place around two hundred meters from the section house of La Sabana and the three corpses were burned. Glorioso claimed that during his employment at La Sabana, he saw the flagellation of indigenous people as well as their internment in the cepo, occurrences which were daily. (Note: Glorioso claimed that while he did not participate in a raid against the Bora people that were ambushed while organizing a dance, he was informed by agents that took part in the raid that more than one hundred indigenous people were killed.)

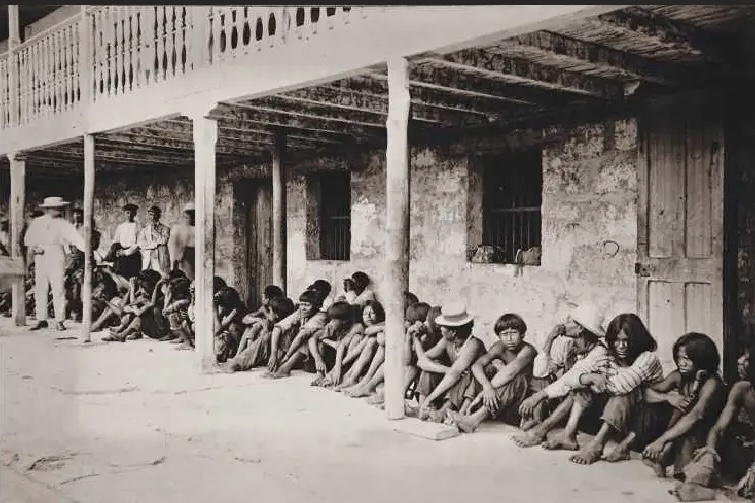
Putumayo natives resting at La Chorrera after delivering rubber

Froilan Patino claimed that he witnessed Aurelio flay thirty imprisoned natives with a whip, afterwards Aurelio ordered his subordinates to behead those thirty natives. The corpses of these thirty natives were cremated in the nearby burning pit. Patino stated that he saw the burning corpses of fifty natives at that pit, natives which were murdered by Aurelio and his subordinates.

Federico or Sacalamecha Muinane claimed that he witnessed Aurelio kill around forty-five indigenous people through the use of bullets, whip and hunger, most of those victims were shot and killed, afterwards their bodies were burned. Ochoa Muinane also testified that on one occasion Arístides had forty five indigenous people murdered with "whips, bullets, stocks and hunger" because they did not deliver enough rubber to meet a quota established by him. Paredes's judicial commission investigated this area and after digging two meters deep only ten skeletons were found, experts determined they belonged to human males. Another deponent, Soldado Muinane stated he witnessed around thirty indigenous people perish through bullets, whips and hunger at Santa Catalina. (Note: Rafael Ocaña corroborated this statement and he claimed that Augustus Walcott and another Barbadian carried out the flagellation..) Soldado provided the names of five indigenous captains that were part of this group, they were Tipaiba, Capache, Nemequirigue, Cuhuachi, Unufaachi and Coerma. All thirty of those indigenous people, a group that consisted of men women and children, were cremated after they died.

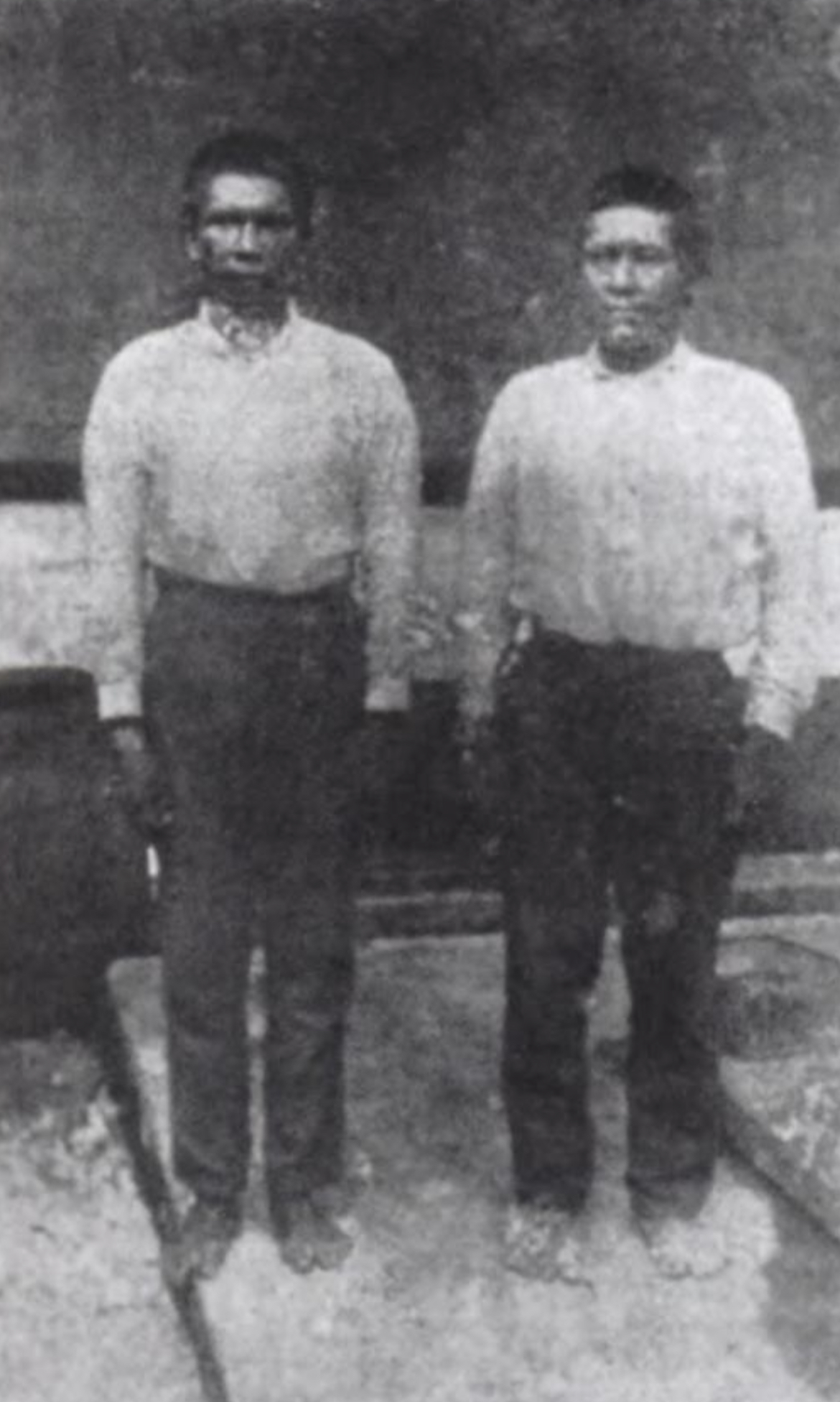
Bushico Boras and Carlos Quinto Nonuya

Daniel Albán was employed at Santa Catalina and during his time he witnessed three indigenous people murdered by three different agents of the station under Aurelio's orders. Aurelio personally flogged indigenous people at his station and ordered his subordinates to do so as well. Albán claimed that on one occasion he saw sixty indigenous women who were flogged at the station, some of whom had blood dripping down their backs. Albán stated that this was either because they did not bring in the amount of rubber desired by Aurelio or he was not satisfied with the quality of rubber delivered. According to Albán, Aurelio was the most demanding manager in regards to the imposition of rubber quotas and Albán witnessed the flagellation of around fifteen indigenous children by Aurelio and his subordinates. Albán also implicated Aurelio in the death of eight indigenous captains who perished in his stations cepo while suffering from flagellation wounds and hunger. The rubber quotas as well as punishments imposed by Aurelio affected indigenous people from the ages of five years old and up. Albán also testified that he witnessed Arístides personally flog more than twenty indigenous people at La Sabana.

Pedro Nonuya stated that he witnessed Aurelio "cruelly punish with a whip" eight indigenous captains, all of which Pedro named and all of which starved to death after their flagellation. These eight captains were named Tipaiba, Capeche, Cuhuachi, Coerma, Nocapi, Parabaqui, Unuballachi and Meteraca. Alejandro Vasquez claimed that Meteraca and another indigenous captain named Cuemal were killed at Santa Catalina because it was believed they had killed white people.

Carlos Seminario wrote to Paredes that at Santa Catalina there were 190 indigenous people that were scarred from flagellation, Seminario stated that Aurelio was responsible for these scars. Alejandro Vasquez Torres later became the replacement manager for La Sabana and during Paredes investigation, Vasquez wrote that one hundred and fifty indigenous people at La Sabana retained wounds or scars from flagellation. According to Vasquez, he was told by these indigenous people that the men responsible for the flagellations were Arístides Rodríguez and the manager that replaced him, Fidel Velarde. Ciriaco Saldaña stated that during his employment at La Sabana he witnessed the flagellation of around nine hundred indigenous people by Arístides.

== After the Peruvian Amazon Company ==
Aristides left La Sabana on 23 July 1909 and he was replaced as the station's manager by Jose Inocente Fonseca. According to Hardenburg, Arístides chose to take up residency in Iquitos and he became "a proud member of the aristocracia of that place". Aurelio Rodriguez retired from the Santa Catalina station in June of 1909 (Note: Clifford Quintin stated that Aurelio left the Santa Catalina around June of 1909 and he travelled to Iquitos.), Casement wrote that Aurelio had amassed a "small fortune" by this time. Aurelio and Arístides both travelled to Europe in 1909, after their retirement from the Peruvian Amazon Company.

Abel Alarco told Romulo Paredes that in 1910 Aurelio and Aristides travelled to Paris . Alarco claimed that they were "attracted mainly by the desire to know the Apaches of that city...Casement was informed that Aristides died while travelling away from Europe. According to The London Gazette, Aristides died on June 18 1910.

Arístides entrusted £400 to a man named Enrique Valencia, this money was meant to go towards Aristides family in the case of his death however Valencia "appropriated this money to his own use". Valencia was imprisoned by judge Valcarcel when he was unable to produce that money, however the president of the Iquitos Court organized the release of Valencia and he fled away from Iquitos shortly afterwards. Valencia's "furniture & goods" were sold at a public auction which was organized by Aristides wife.

While in Europe, Aurelio purchased a steamship named Shishaquita and this asset was transported to Iquitos. Aurelio made several voyages on this ship prior to his arrest in February of 1911. On February 14 of 1911, the Prefect of Iquitos telegraphed English Consul-General Lucien Jerome that local authorities were going to arrest Aurelio Rodriguez. On April 13 the Prefect informed Jerome that Aurelio had provided judge Romulo Paredes information and that Aurelio had been admitted to bail for £2,000, a payment which was provided by Pablo Zumaeta. Zumaeta claimed that he was under the persuasion that Aurelio had not "committed the crimes of which he was accused." In May of 1915, Aurelio, Armando Normand and another criminal escaped from prison in Iquitos prior to the issuing of a judicial verdict against them.

== Notes ==
=== Bibliography ===
- Chirif, Alberto (2009). Imaginario e Imágenes de la época del caucho [Imaginary and Images of the rubber era] (in Spanish) (illustrated ed.). Putumayo: Amazon Center for Anthropology and Practical Application. ISBN 978-997260827-8.
- Goodman, Jordan (2009). The Devil and Mr Casement: One Man's Struggle for Human Rights in South America's Heart of Darkness. London: Verso. ISBN 9781844673346.
- Hardenburg, Walter (1912). The Putumayo, the Devil's Paradise; Travels in the Peruvian Amazon Region and an Account of the Atrocities Committed Upon the Indians Therein. Putumayo: London: Fischer Unwin. p. 200. ISBN 1372293019. Also available via Wikisource.
- Hardenburg, Walter (1912). Transcript of 'The Devil's Paradise. / A catalogue of crime' by W. E. Hardenburg. National Library of Ireland.
- Casement, Roger (1997). The Amazon Journal of Roger Casement. Anaconda Editions. ISBN 978-1-901990-05-8.
- Paternoster, Sidney (1913). The Lords of the Devil's Paradise. S. Paul & Company.
- Slavery in Peru: Message from the President of the United States Transmitting Report of the Secretary of State, with Accompanying Papers, Concerning the Alleged Existence of Slavery in Peru. United States. Department of State. 1913.
- Robuchon, Eugène; Rey de Castro, Carlos (1907). En el Putumayo y sus afluentes (in Spanish). Imprenta La industria. ISBN 978-5-88022-309-1.
- Taussig, Michael (1991). Shamanism, Colonialism, and the Wild Man. University of Chicago Press. ISBN 0226790118.
- Thomson, Norman (1913). The Putumayo Red Book with an Introduction on the Real Scandal of the Putumayo Atrocities. N. Thomson & Company.
- Parliamentary Papers: Select Committee on the Putumayo. House of Commons or House of Lords Papers. 1913. p. 38.
- Valcárcel, Carlos (2004). El proceso del Putumayo y sus secretos inauditos. The International Work Group for Indigenous Affairs.
- Casement, Roger (2003). Mitchell, Angus (ed.). Sir Roger Casement's Heart of Darkness: The 1911 Documents. Irish Manuscripts Commission. ISBN 9781874280989.
- Zumaeta, Pablo (1913). Las cuestiones del Putumayo: memorial. Impr. Viuda de L. Tasso, 1913.
- Hemming, John (2008). Tree of rivers : the story of the Amazon. London : Thames & Hudson.
- Olarte Camacho, Vicente (1911). Las crueldades en el Putumayo y en el Caquetá. Imprenta Eléctrica.
