= Araracuara, Colombia =

Remote settlement in the Colombian Amazon

Araracuara
- Populated center
- Location in Colombia
- Coordinates: 0°36′2″S 72°23′53″W
- Country: Colombia
- Department: Caquetá
- Municipality: Solano
- Elevation: 380 m (1,250 ft)

Population (2018 census)
  - Total: 165
- Time zone: UTC−5 (COT)
- ISO 3166 code: CO-CAQ

Araracuara is a remote populated center of Colombia in the municipality of Solano, Caquetá Department, Colombia, situated on the north bank of the Caquetá River in the western Amazon basin. The settlement lies across the river from the locality of Puerto Santander in Amazonas Department, at a point where the Caquetá narrows into a deep sandstone canyon known as the Cañón de Araracuara or Raudal de Araracuara. The name Araracuara derives from a Tupí-Guaraní word meaning 'macaw's nest', a reference to the large colonies of macaws that inhabit the canyon walls. As of the 2018 Colombian census, the settlement had a population of 165 inhabitants.

Araracuara is accessible primarily by air, through Araracuara Airport, and by river; no roads connect it to the rest of the country. Because of its extreme isolation, the site was used as a federal agricultural penal colony (Colonia Penal y Agrícola del Sur) from 1938 to 1971, a period that defined the settlement's infrastructure and modern layout. Since the late 20th century, the Araracuara region has been an important focus of archaeological, paleoecological, and biodiversity research, particularly studies of pre-Columbian anthropogenic soils (terra preta) and of the distinctive vegetation of Amazonian sandstone outcrops.

== Geography ==
=== Location ===
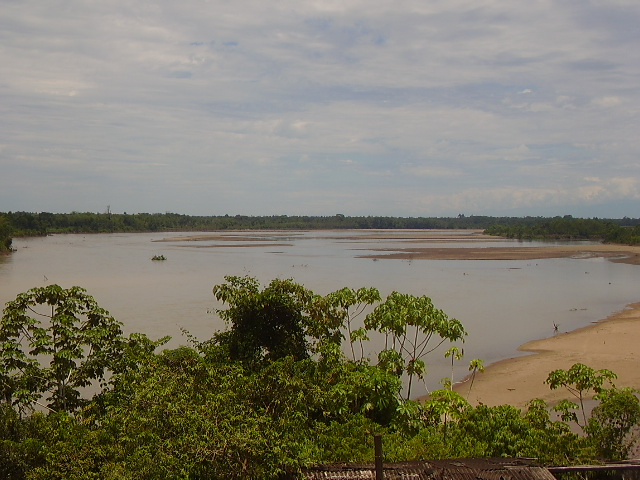
The Caquetá River in the Colombian Amazon, whose banks host remote settlements such as Araracuara

Araracuara is located on the north bank of the Caquetá River, within the municipality of Solano in the southern part of Caquetá Department. The settlement sits at an elevation of roughly 380 m (1,250 ft) above sea level. The Caquetá is a major Amazon tributary that is known downstream in Brazil as the Japurá River. Araracuara lies directly across the river from the locality of Puerto Santander, which belongs to Amazonas Department, so that the Caquetá River at this point forms the boundary between the two departments. In regional terms, Araracuara lies within a belt of sedimentary outcrops and mesas that continues across the Caquetá into Amazonas Department. The nearest cities with road connections are hundreds of kilometers away; the departmental capital, Florencia, lies far to the northwest, and the settlement is reachable only by air or by river navigation along the Caquetá and its tributary the Orteguaza River. Araracuara is situated to the south of Serranía de Chiribiquete, a vast sandstone plateau that forms part of Chiribiquete National Park.

=== Landscape and geology ===
The physical landscape around Araracuara is dominated by the Caquetá River and by Paleozoic sandstone formations that form part of the western extension of the Guiana Shield. These sedimentary plateaus and outcrops are among the southernmost exposures of the Guiana Shield in the western Amazon. At the settlement, the river passes through the Cañón de Araracuara, a narrow, deep gorge with high vertical walls carved through these lithic strata, creating the rapids (raudal) that give the locality much of its geographic identity. The canyon extends for roughly 13 km (8.1 mi) and, at its narrowest, constricts the Caquetá to about 100 m (330 ft). Downstream of the canyon, the Raudal de Angosturas extends for about 8 km (5 mi), constricting the river's flow into a series of fast-flowing rapids and waterfalls flanked by sandstone cliffs. Sandstone plateaus and outcrops (locally called tepuis) rise above the surrounding lowland rainforest, supporting distinctive, floristically specialized vegetation. The Araracuara plateau is a Paleozoic siliciclastic (non-carbonate sedimentary rocks) tableland of roughly 16 km^{2} (6.2 sq mi) that rises by about 200 m (660 ft) above the surrounding terrain. The plateau surface includes wet white sands and exposed rocky substrates that support a mosaic of low forest, scrub, and herbaceous communities. The geomorphology of the middle Caquetá basin has been characterized by a mosaic of alluvial terraces, terra firme uplands, and sandstone mesas, shaped by the interaction of Precambrian basement rocks, Paleozoic sedimentary cover, and Quaternary fluvial (river) processes. The regional climate is classified as very humid equatorial, with mean annual temperatures around 26 °C (79 °F) and annual rainfall on the order of 3,000 to 3,500 mm (120 to 140 in).

== History ==
=== Indigenous occupation ===
The middle Caquetá River region around Araracuara has been inhabited by indigenous peoples for thousands of years. Archaeological evidence from sites near Araracuara, including the Abeja and Peña Roja rock shelters, has yielded some of the earliest dates for human occupation in the Colombian Amazon, with evidence of plant cultivation and forest management extending back into the early and middle Holocene. From the time of European contact, the area around Araracuara has been home to multiple indigenous groups, including the Witoto (Huitoto), Muinane, Andoque, and Nonuya, each with distinct languages, ceremonial traditions, and systems of land use. In regional ethnography, several of these societies are often discussed within the broader "People of the Center" cultural complex of the Caquetá–Putumayo interfluvium. Community life centered on the maloca, with social and ceremonial practices tied to rivers, gardens, and forest resources. These communities were severely affected by the Putumayo rubber boom in the early 20th century, which caused a drastic population decline across the region between the census years of 1918 and 1938. The Peruvian Amazon Company (Casa Arana), which operated across the wider Putumayo region, subjected indigenous communities to forced labor and widespread violence.

=== Araracuara penal colony ===
In 1938, the Colombian government established the Colonia Penal y Agrícola del Sur ('Southern Agricultural Penal Colony') at Araracuara, which operated until 1971. The penal colony was created under the Penal Code of 1938 as a facility for convicted prisoners, taking advantage of the site's remoteness as a form of confinement. Escape was effectively prevented by the surrounding jungle, the distance to the nearest settlements, and the rapids of the Caquetá. The colony combined incarceration with compulsory labor and a program of agricultural production intended to supply the settlement and support state presence in the region. Daily subsistence also involved fishing, the gathering of forest products, and animal husbandry alongside crop cultivation. For the first two decades of its operation, the colony gave little consideration to the ecological characteristics of the Amazonian environment, and agricultural production was plagued by chronic crises in supply and output, contrary to popular accounts of the colony's supposed abundance. Beginning around 1958, the colony introduced more systematic agricultural methods, organized labor and social structures, and adopted methods of cultivation and animal husbandry better suited to the tropical setting. The colony's history demonstrated the limitations of imposing Andean-zone agricultural systems on the Amazon, an experience later cited as a cautionary example for development planners. Infrastructure developed during the penal colony period, including the airstrip and associated buildings and services, provided the physical basis for the settlement that persisted after the colony's closure.

=== Development of the modern settlement ===
After the penal colony closed in 1971, Araracuara continued as a small civilian settlement, sustained in part by its airstrip and its function as a regional administrative and logistical node in the middle Caquetá. The area became an important base for scientific research beginning in the 1980s, when the Tropenbos-Colombia program established its research site in the Araracuara region and conducted studies on tropical ecology, soils, and forest management. In 1993, the Corporación Araracuara was succeeded by the Instituto Amazónico de Investigaciones Científicas (SINCHI), which has maintained a research presence in the area. The airstrip has continued to serve as the main access point for scientific field campaigns in the region. Indigenous communities in the surrounding area, including those at Monochoa, Aduche, Villa Azul, and Peña Roja, maintained their presence throughout the post-colonial period and into the present day. The settlement and surrounding region were affected by the Colombian conflict, as Caquetá Department was a zone of activity for armed groups and illicit coca cultivation during the late 20th century, although the area has become more accessible to researchers and visitors following the 2016 peace agreement.

== Archaeology ==
The Araracuara region has been a focal point for archaeological research in the Colombian Amazon since the 1970s, with intensive field and laboratory work expanding in the early 1980s. Investigations at sites near the settlement have identified and analyzed significant deposits of anthropogenic dark earth soils, specifically terra preta (black earth) and terra mulata (brown earth). These fertile, man-made soils represent the first such sites analyzed west of the Brazilian Amazon, demonstrating that pre-Columbian soil management was a widespread regional phenomenon.

Human occupation in the area is defined by three primary ceramic phases: the Somindubari phase, with radiocarbon dates of roughly 1,565–775 Before Present (BP); the Camani phase (plainware pottery, approximately second to ninth centuries AD); and the Nofurei phase (pottery of the Polychrome Tradition, approximately ninth to seventeenth centuries AD). The scale of these deposits—spanning approximately six hectares of terra preta and twenty hectares of terra mulata—suggests high population densities and stable, concentrated settlements.

Ancient inhabitants practiced a prolonged horticultural system that contrasts with the slash-and-burn agriculture common today. The Araracuara sequence documents a "technical transformation" of the landscape over centuries, involving repeated inputs of organic waste, charcoal, and river-deposited silt (alluvium) likely gathered from Caquetá River banks during low-water months. These practices maintained fertility on relatively small cultivated areas by significantly elevating soil organic carbon and phosphorus relative to nearby non-anthropogenic soils.

Evidence from the broader middle Caquetá area, including the Peña Roja and Abeja sites, reveals early Holocene occupations involving the cultivation of squash and other plants, which significantly extends the region's known chronology of human land use. Along the Caquetá-Japurá river system, terra preta soils at Araracuara, Villa Azul, and Peña Roja are associated with markers of long-term habitation, including ceramic sherds (pottery fragments), charcoal, and phytolith assemblages (microscopic silica structures from plants).

Regional syntheses of the corridor between La Pedrera and Araracuara have further documented petroglyphs, lithic (stone tool) assemblages, and additional ceramic sequences that place these local findings into a wider Amazonian context.

== Ecology and biodiversity ==
=== Flora ===
The sandstone plateaus and outcrops near Araracuara support a distinctive flora that differs markedly from the surrounding lowland rainforest. Palynological work on the Araracuara sandstone plateau compared modern pollen rain with vegetation data from 92 vegetation survey plots to assess how pollen spectra reflect local plant composition on these nutrient-poor substrates. In the same study, pollen analysis from a short (25 cm (10 in)) sediment core was interpreted as recording a late-Holocene transition from more open vegetation dominated by plants of the family Rapateaceae to scrub dominated by Bonnetia martiana, within a mosaic-like vegetation pattern on the plateau. The pollen record was also used to infer aspects of fire history and vegetation dynamics on the sandstone surface. Behling, Berrío, and Hooghiemstra analyzed late Quaternary pollen records from lake sediments in the middle Caquetá basin (including the Pantano de Monica terrace area), reconstructing vegetation and climate changes spanning thousands of years and reporting long-term persistence of rainforest in the region despite climatic fluctuations.

Arbeláez and Duivenvoorden studied patterns of plant species composition on Amazonian sandstone outcrops in Colombia, including those at Araracuara, and found that the vegetation of these outcrops is floristically distinct and harbors species associated with poor-soil and rock-scrub habitats, with affinities to the flora of the Guiana Shield flat-top mountains (tepuis) to the east. A vegetation-classification study on the Araracuara plateau described seven savanna vegetation types and emphasized the role of wet white sands and exposed rocky substrates in structuring low forest, scrub, and herbaceous communities on the sandstone surface.

Lichenological work published in 2023 has shown that the Araracuara region forms part of an exceptionally diverse lichen flora in the Colombian Amazon. A revision of Instituto SINCHI's herbarium specimen collections produced the first comprehensive checklist for the region, documenting 666 lichen species for the Colombian Amazon (including 28 species described as new to science). Numerous voucher records and several newly described taxa are based on material collected in the Araracuara area along the Caquetá River, including Myriotrema araracuarense, named for the region. Other fungi named for the region include Bapalmuia araracuarensis, Ophiocordyceps araracuarensis, and Penicillium araracuarense.

=== Fauna ===
Ornithological surveys conducted by Socolar, Fernando-Castaño, and Arango near Araracuara and Puerto Santander in 2019 and 2021 yielded substantial range extensions for several bird species, including the white-winged potoo, the rusty tinamou, the Rio Negro gnatcatcher, and the masked yellowthroat. The surveys described poor-soil forests and rock-scrub habitats associated with outcrops of the "Araracuara formation" and reported field work at multiple localities on both sides of the Caquetá River. Additional observations from the Araracuara area include records of the Chiribiquete emerald on rock outcrops and the cliff flycatcher on canyon cliffs. The same surveys reported that several bird species previously considered characteristic of poor-soil forests and rocky outcrop habitats on the Chiribiquete massif to the north also occur at Araracuara, extending their known ranges southward to the Caquetá River and beyond. Some records from the Araracuara area have been described as the first documented Colombian occurrences for species such as rusty tinamou and the white-winged potoo.

== Transportation ==
=== Airport ===
Araracuara Airport is the primary link between the settlement and the rest of Colombia. The airport has a single unpaved runway at an elevation of approximately 380 m (1,250 ft) above sea level. It is served by the state-owned regional airline SATENA, which operates scheduled flights linking Araracuara with regional centers. Due to the lack of road access, air transport is important for delivering supplies and for medical evacuation from surrounding communities. The airstrip was originally built during the penal colony era and has served as a military and civilian facility since. The airstrip has also been used as a logistical access point for scientific field research in the Araracuara region.

=== River transport ===
The Caquetá River is the other major transportation route to and from Araracuara, although navigation is complicated by the rapids at the canyon. Motorized canoes and larger boats travel the Caquetá from upstream settlements and from downstream points such as La Pedrera, but passage through the Raudal de Araracuara and the Raudal de Angosturas requires experienced boatmen and is hazardous. The rapids interrupt continuous navigation in this sector, and travel and freight movement may involve portage around major rapids or the use of specific navigable reaches between them. River transport remains essential for the indigenous communities along the middle Caquetá, for whom the river serves as the principal route for trade, travel, and communication. It is also the main option for moving heavy cargo in the absence of roads.
