= 2023 Caquetá Cessna Stationair crash =

Air crash and rescue

- The wreckage of the aircraft at the crash site

Accident
- Date: 1 May 2023
- Summary: Engine failure
- Site: Near Solano, Caquetá, Colombia; 00°54′18.5″N 72°24′44.1″W

Aircraft
- Aircraft type: Cessna 206
- Operator: Avianline Charters
- Registration: HK-2803
- Flight origin: Araracuara Airport, Colombia
- Destination: Jorge Enrique González Torres Airport, San Jose del Guaviare, Colombia
- Occupants: 7
- Passengers: 6
- Crew: 1
- Fatalities: 3
- Survivors: 4

On 1 May 2023, a Cessna 206 light aircraft with seven people on board crashed in the jungle in the Caquetá Department of Colombia. Two of the occupants – the pilot and co-pilot were killed on impact, while four passengers survived the crash. The mother survived for several days and died, leaving the children to fend for themselves. The children, between 11 months and 13 years old, survived for 40 days in the rainforest before being rescued by the Colombian military and volunteers from local indigenous groups.

== Flight ==
The 1982 Cessna U206G aircraft, operated by Avianline Charters, departed on the morning of 1 May 2023, from Araracuara Airport, Colombia, on a domestic charter flight to San José del Guaviare, 350 kilometres (220 mi) to the north. At 7:34 local time, the pilot made a distress call reporting engine failure, and radio contact was lost shortly after. The Colombian Air Force immediately sent out craft to search the area – a Basler BT-67 and Bell Huey helicopter.

== Passengers and crew ==
On board the aircraft were the pilot, Hernando Murcia Morales, aged 57, with about 8300 flight hours, and six passengers: a mother, Magdalena Mucutuy Valencia, with her four children aged approximately 13, 9, 4, and 1 years old, and a local indigenous leader, Herman Mendoza Hernández. The pilot and Mendoza died on impact and the mother died four days later. The four siblings survived. The family was part of the Witoto, an indigenous group familiar with the jungle environment and who are taught to hunt, fish and gather from an early age.

== Search and rescue ==
After the crash, as the children subsequently relayed to the authorities, their mother urged them to "leave and get help." The four children walked away from the wreckage and started roaming the forest, surviving by eating cassava flour retrieved from the plane's wreckage, fruits from Bacaba palm trees and seeds from avichure trees in their surroundings based on their knowledge of native plants as members of the Witoto indigenous group.

=== Search ===
Search and rescue teams from the Colombian military and local indigenous communities started searching the area for wreck and remains. They located the wreckage of the Cessna on 15 May, two weeks after the crash. Colombian President Gustavo Petro initially tweeted that the children had been found at that time, but that tweet was retracted less than 24 hours later. They also found items belonging to the children, including a child's drinking bottle, and traces of a makeshift shelter, suggesting that the children could still be alive. A small footprint was found a week later. Loudspeakers with a range of 1.5 km (1 mi) were used to broadcast messages in the Witoto language to the children, advising them to stay in one location so that they could be found by the searchers. The head of the Colombian Institute of Family Welfare said the fact that "the jungle was in harvest" meant the children could find and eat fruit that was in bloom.

During the search operation, Wilson, a search and rescue Belgian Shepherd that helped the rescuers find a path eventually leading to the children's whereabouts, went missing. A subsequent, two-weeks-long operation with over 70 men was launched to find him but was unsuccessful.

=== Rescue ===
Forty days after the crash, on 10 June 2023, the four children were found and evacuated to the Colombian capital Bogotá for medical treatment. According to the rescuers, the children were malnourished and had many insect bites, but no major health issues. By the time the children were discovered, about 150 troops and rescuers and 200 volunteers from local indigenous groups were searching for them. President Petro said it was "an example of total survival which will remain in history".

== Investigation ==
The Colombian Civil Aviation Authority is responsible for the investigation of this accident. The final report was published in 2025, citing the major cause as engine failure likely caused by either fuel system failure or fuel contamination. The investigation team made several safety recommendations on fuel system inspection, search and rescue services, operations in the Amazon region, and other issues.

== Aftermath ==
Following the rescue of the children, their maternal grandfather, Narciso Mucutuy, requested that the children be relocated closer to their family in Villavicencio. A custody battle ensued between the father of the two youngest children, Manuel Ranoque, and their grandfather, who laid claims of domestic violence against their father. The two elder children have a different father and Ranoque has not been granted access to them following the accident. As of 13 June 2023, a child protection agency was in the process of interviewing relatives to determine the most suitable custody arrangement and said it was investigating the allegations of domestic abuse.

=== In media ===
The search for the children was the subject of a 2024 Netflix documentary film, The Lost Children, and a 2025 National Geographic documentary film, Lost in the Jungle.
