= Zeremariam Fre =

Eritrean-British environmentalist (b. 1951)

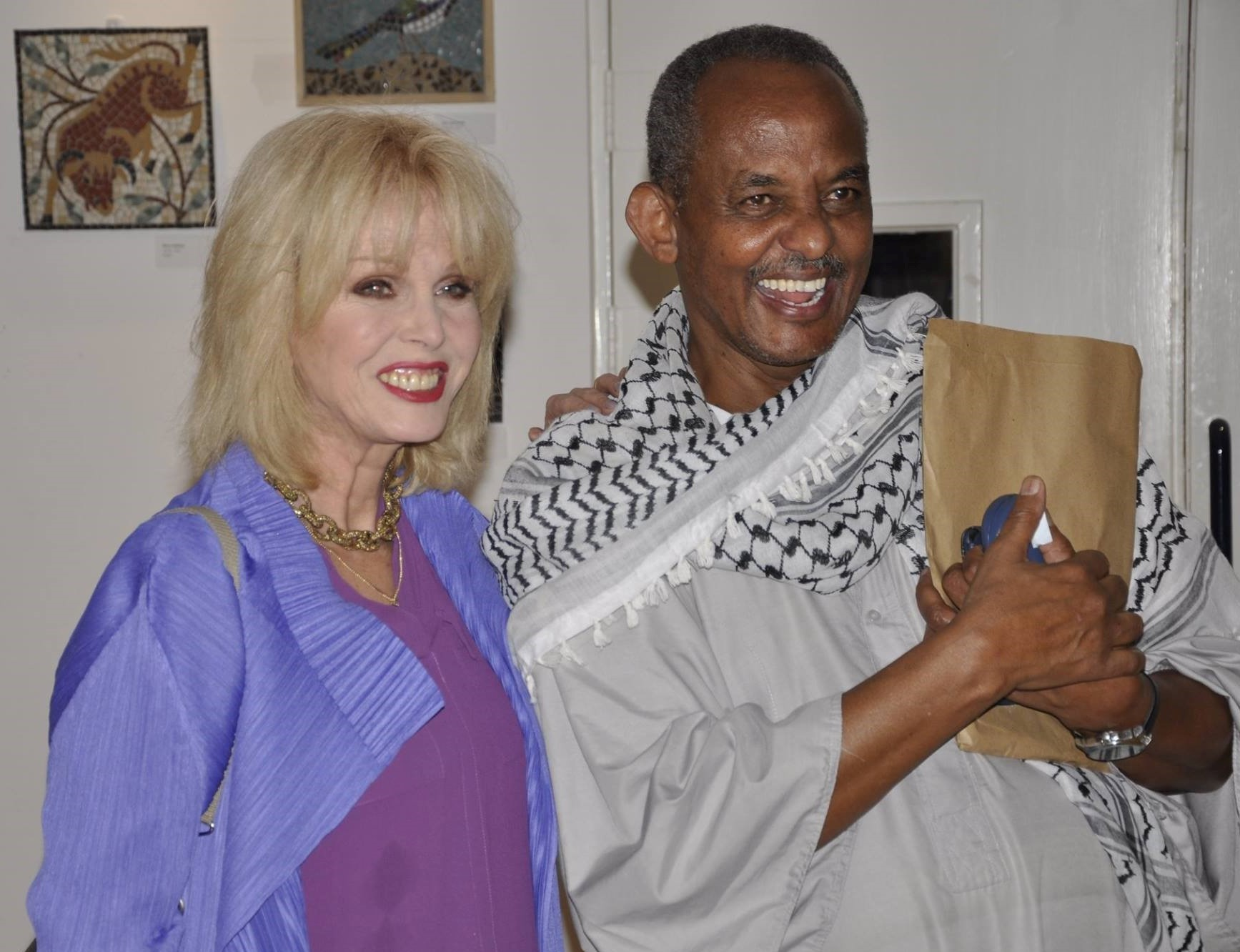
- Fre at a PENHA event with patron Joanna Lumley in December 2016
- Born: 1951 (age 74–75); Keren, Eritrea
- Education: Royal Agricultural University, University of Reading
- Known for: Founder of the Pastoral and Environmental Network in the Horn of Africa
- Spouse: Biri Tesfaldet
- Children: 2

Academic background
- Thesis: Pastoral development in Eritrea and Eastern Sudan: Implications for Livestock Extension Programmes (1989)

Academic work
- Discipline: Agriculturalist
- Institutions: University College London (2002-present)
- Main interests: Pastoralism

Zeremariam Fre (born 1951 in Keren, western Eritrea) is an agriculturalist, specialising in the drylands, and is of dual Eritrean-British nationality. He is the founder and former director of the Pastoral and Environmental Network in the Horn of Africa (PENHA), where he now serves on the Board of Trustees as Treasurer.

== Background ==
Fre is the son of Fre Worie and Letezion Beyed. He was born to a farming family in the suburbs of Keren city in western Eritrea and is married to Biri Tesfaldet, with whom he has two children and two grandchildren. His primary and secondary school education was carried out in Catholic mission/seminary schools in Keren and Asmara in Eritrea.

== Education and career ==
Fre holds a Diploma in Agriculture from the Royal Agricultural University in the UK, and an MSc and PhD in agricultural extension and rural development from the University of Reading, Faculty of Agriculture, UK. His field-based MSc and PhD work (1983 to 1989) was focused on Pastoral development in Eritrea and Eastern Sudan: Implications for Livestock Extension Programmes. Having finished his PhD, he founded the non-governmental organisation the Pastoral and Environmental Network in the Horn of Africa (PENHA) in 1989 - which he led for 27 years from 1990 to 2017, and of which Joanna Lumley is patron. PENHA promotes sustainable development among pastoral and agro-pastoral communities through gender equality, resilience building, enterprise, innovation and regional cooperation across the Horn of Africa.

Fre's career has focused on policy research and advocacy on pastoralism, land use and natural resource management, indigenous knowledge systems, pastoral women's rights, and the promotion of regional peace in the Horn of Africa through cooperation between states. He was a member of the Science and Technology Committee of the United Nations Convention to Combat Desertification (UNCCD) (1992–1995), Research Fellow at the International Institute for Environment and Development (IIED) Drylands Programme (1991–1996) under the leadership of Camilla Toulmin, and Africa Grants Committee member for Comic Relief UK (1992–1994).

He was appointed teaching fellow and course tutor at the Bartlett Development Planning Unit, University College London (UCL) in September 2002, where he currently teaches the MSc modules on land, food and agriculture and urban and peri-urban agriculture: knowledge systems in the global South. In 2020, he was promoted to associate professor. He has supervised more than 90 masters' dissertations and co-supervised many PhDs.

Fre speaks several languages including English, Italian, Latin, spoken Arabic, and five Horn of African languages (namely Tigrigna, Bilen, Tigre, Amharic and Ge'ez).

In 2018, Fre was awarded the Desmond Tutu Reconciliation Fellowship Award (FGR) by Global Reconciliation for his work on environmental care. He received the award in Melbourne, Australia in October 2018.

Fre's recent research is on social protection among the agro-pastoralist and pastoralist communities in the Afar Region of Ethiopia. His co-authored book entitled `Social Protection, Pastoralism and Resilience in Ethiopia: Lessons for Sub-Saharan Africa' was published by Routledge in August 2022. His open access monograph Knowledge Sovereignty among African Cattle Herders was published in June 2018, and can be downloaded free.

Fre has worked in Djibouti, Eritrea, Ethiopia, Kenya, Somaliland, South Sudan, Sudan, Tanzania, Uganda, as well as Japan, Peru and the United Kingdom, with working visits to Canada, Denmark, France, Iceland, Italy, the Netherlands, Norway, Poland, South Africa, Sweden, Switzerland, Tunisia, the United States and Zambia.

== Publications ==
- Fre, Z., Tsegay, B., Teka, A. M., Kenton, N. and Livingstone, J. 2022. Social Protection, Pastoralism and Resilience: Lessons for Sub-Saharan Africa. Routledge.
- Fre, Z. 2018. Knowledge Sovereignty among African Cattle Herders. London: UCL Press.
- Fre, Z., Negash, Z., Temesgen, G., Tsegay, B., Teka, A. M., Weldesilassie, B., Araya, S.T. and Kenton, N. 2018. SPIDA Conference Proceedings: Social protection as a pathway for inclusive development among the pastoral and agro-pastoral communities in Africa, ADU/PENHA/DPU-UCL - SPIDA-PR/02/February 2018, London, UK.
- Fre, Z. and Dixon, N. 2017. Social protection among the Afar pastoral and agro-pastoral communities in Ethiopia: Critical reflections on the multi-partner efforts, achievements, challenges and some lessons learnt, SPIDA Working Paper Series ADU/PENHA/DPUUCL SPIDA/WPS/104/2017.
- Fre, Z., Tsegay, B., Temesgen, G., Araya, S. T., Kenton, N. 2017. Social protection among the Afar pastoralist communities in Ethiopia: Beyond survival towards transformation, ADU/PENHA/DPU-UCL SPIDA Policy Brief, November 2017.
- Fre, Z., Temesgen, G., Negash, Z., Araya, S. T., Tsegay, B., Teka, A. M. and Weldesilassie, B. 2017. Social Protection for Inclusive Development in Afar Region of Ethiopia: Participatory Rural Appraisal Report, SPIDA Working Paper Series- SPIDA/WPS/102/2017, September, 2017.
- Fre, Z. and Tsegay, B. 2016. ‘Economic Contribution of Pastoral and Agro pastoral Production to Food Security and Livelihoods Systems in Africa: The Case of Eastern Sudan, Eritrea and Western Ethiopia in the Horn of Africa.’ In Amare Desta, Mentesnot Mengesha and Mammo Muchie (eds) Putting Knowledge to Work: From Knowledge Transfer to Knowledge Exchange, 148–79. Trenton, NJ: Africa World Press.
- Fre, Z. 2009. Pastoralism in the Horn of Africa – To Be or Not To Be: An Evolutionary Perspective. Journal of the Institute of Anthropology, Gender and African Studies n.s. 10, 6–14.
- Fre, Z. 2009. The New Phenomenon of Land Grabbing in Africa and its Impact on Livelihoods and Ecosystems. Lecture, United Nations University, 13 November.
- Fre, Z. (editor in chief), Talal Mirghani Abedelnoor, NuhaHamed Talib, Afaf Abdel Rahim Mabrouk, Mona Abedelrahim Mohamed, Mohamed Ibrahim El-Mahi, Hamid Hussein Abu-Eisa and Harnet Bokrezion. 2009. The Use of Alternative Animal Feeds to Enhance Food Security and Environmental Protection in the Sudan: The Case for Prosopis Juliflora. PENHA Research Paper.
- Fre, Z., Ibnoaf, M. and Kuwata, H. 2008. The Impact of Increased Food Prices on Rural-Urban-Rural Relationships The Case of Eastern Sudan. International Institute for Environment and Development (IIED) and United Nations Fund for Population (UNFPA), Khartoum.
