= Abel Rodríguez =

Abel Rodríguez may refer to:

- Abel Rodríguez (actor)
- Abel Rodríguez (artist)
