= HUX =

Hux or HUX may refer to:

- Bahías de Huatulco International Airport (airport code: HUX), in the state of Oaxaca, Mexico
- Armitage Hux, a First Order general in the Star Wars universe
- Hux, a short film by Mageina Tovah
- Hux Records, a British record label
- Nüpode Huitoto language (language code: hux), spoken in Peru
