= Araracuara Airport =

- IATA: ACR; ICAO: SKAC

Summary
- Serves: Araracuara, Colombia
- Elevation AMSL: 1,246 ft / 380 m
- Coordinates: 0°36′03″S 72°23′53″W

Map

Runways
Direction	Length		Surface
Direction	m	ft	Surface
11/29	1,280	4,199	Gravel
- Source: GCM HERE Maps Aeronáutica Civil

Araracuara Airport (IATA: ACR, ICAO: SKAC) is an airport serving Araracuara, in the Caquetá Department of Colombia. Araracuara was the site of a former penal colony for Colombia's worst and most dangerous criminals. The town and airport are on the north bank of the Caquetá River, an eventual tributary of the Amazon River.

The Araracuara non-directional beacon (Ident: ARA) is located just south of the airport.

== Airlines and destinations ==
Airlines	Destinations
SATENA	Florencia, La Chorrera

== Accidents and incidents ==
- On 6 September 2014, ten people were killed when a twin-engine Piper PA-31 Navajo aircraft, a small passenger plane belonging to the Laser company, crashed in the Amazon rainforest near Puerto Santander after taking off from Araracuara Airport. Among those killed were two researchers from the Alexander von Humboldt Biological Resources Research Institute. There were no survivors.
- On the first of May 2023, a Cessna 206 took off and crashed in the jungle. Four Huitoto children, the only survivors of the crash, were found alive 40 days later.

== See also ==
- Transport in Colombia
- List of airports in Colombia
