= María Clemencia Herrera Nemerayema =

Witoto Colombian activist (born 1968)

María Clemencia Herrera Nemerayema (born 1968) is a Witoto Colombian indigenous, women rights and biodiversity activist. From an early age, she served in this role with National Indigenous Organization of Colombia (ONIC) and has founded entities to defend and promote indigenous youth and women.

== Career ==
Herrera was born in 1968 in La Chorrera, Amazonas, Colombia, in the Garza Blanca clan of the Witoto people. Her grandparents and great-grandparents were victims of the Amazon rubber cycle, and her father, Eulogio Herrera, contributed greatly to the reconstruction of La Chorrera, which was left with fewer than ten houses.

As a child, her grandfather took her on trips through the Amazon jungle and passed on his indigenous wisdom to her, especially about the relationship with nature. When she was older, she entered the Santa Teresita del Niño Jesús boarding school in La Chorrera, without knowing how to speak Spanish since she spoke Minica Huitoto language and never abandoned it. There, she understood the need to care for nature after seeing her classmates' attitude of not caring for it. After finishing primary school, Herrera returned to her community. Shortly afterwards, in 1986, she studied secondary school at a social advancement school in Viotá, Cundinamarca. She was able to combine her studies with work in Bogotá, where she joined National Indigenous Organization of Colombia (ONIC) and advised the indigenous people who participated in the Constituent Assembly of Colombia.

After finishing high school, in 1991 Herrera went to Putumayo to support the Organic Law on Land Use Planning. In 1992, Herrera participated in project management training in the Amazon and in research on projects in the Amazon Basin, which allowed her to travel to other countries in the Amazon.

She founded the School of Political Training for Leadership and Governance in the Colombian Amazon of the National Organization of Indigenous Peoples of the Colombian Amazon (OPIAC), which trains and empowers dozens of young indigenous people every year, and Mujer, Tejer y Saberes (Mutesa) in 2004, which helps female artisans from the Amazon who have migrated to Bogotá to promote and sell their art. Since 2002 she teaches at the Fund for the Development of Indigenous Peoples of Latin America and the Caribbean.

In 2003, while Herrera was representing indigenous peoples at the peace negotiation table, she was called to engage in direct dialogue with the FARC. At the meeting, a militant pointed a gun at her, but when he saw that she was accompanied by her young daughter, he did not shoot her.

Herrera has promoted the initiative to create an indigenous and intercultural university, especially to educate communities that are geographically distant from urban areas.

== Personal life ==
Herrera has three children.

== Awards ==
- Bartolomé de las Casas Prize, for her "work in defending territories through the recovery of local cultures and the sustainable use of Amazonian resources" (Spanish Agency for International Development Cooperation, 2019)
