= SKAC =

SKAC is the abbreviation of:

- Araracuara Airport, an airport serving Araracuara, Colombia, by ICAO code
- Storm King Art Center in Mountainville, New York, US, an open-air museum
