= HUU =

HUU may refer to:

- Alférez FAP David Figueroa Fernandini Airport, serving Huánuco, Peru
- Hull University Union, at the University of Hull, in England
- Murui Huitoto language, spoken in Peru
