= Tropenbos International =

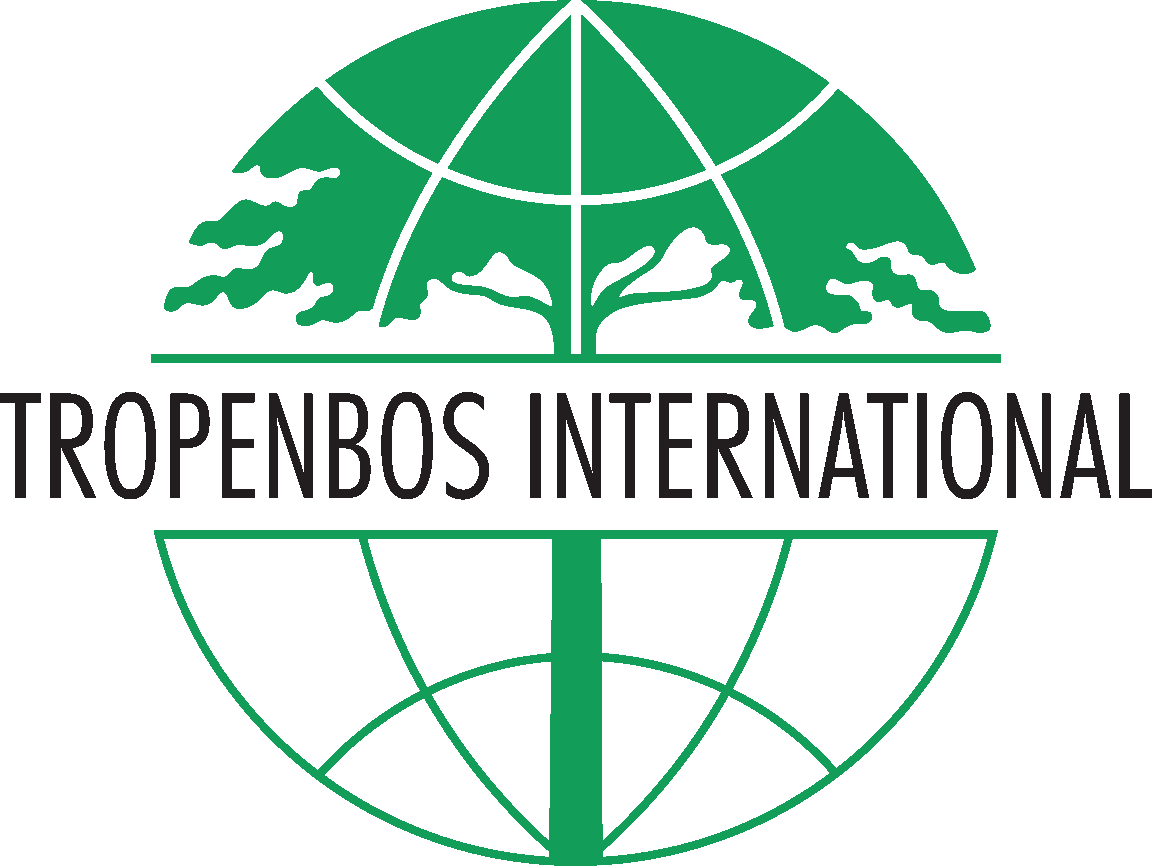
Logo

Tropenbos International is a non-profit based in the Netherlands that supports local, multi-stakeholder interventions on sustainable landscapes in tropical forests. They currently have local affiliates in Colombia, the Democratic Republic of Congo, Ethiopia, Ghana, Indonesia, Suriname, and, Viet Nam as well as projects in other countries. Some work by Tropenbos has been funded by the UN. They regularly publish reports making recommendations on how to manage forests and other landscape and conservation issues.

== Programs and activities ==
=== Colombia ===
Tropenbos Colombia has sponsored indigenous artist Abel Rodriguez.

=== Ethiopia ===
Tropenbos Ethiopia works through its local partner, the Pastoral and Environmental Network in the Horn of Africa (PENHA), on landscape restoration in the drylands regions. In 2021, it drafted a national drylands strategy which has been approved by the Ethiopian government.

=== Ghana ===
Tropenbos Ghana collaborates with the Forestry Commission to develop processes for participatory governance over forests under pressure from cocoa production. They also facilitated a 5-year research project focused on charcoal production in Ghana.
