= Nüpode Huitoto language =

Witotoan language of Peru and Colombia

Nüpode Huitoto
- Nɨpóde
- Native to: Peru, Colombia
- Ethnicity: Witoto people
- Native speakers: 250 (2017)
- Language family: Witotoan: Witoto; Nüpode Huitoto
- Writing system: Latin

Language codes
- ISO 639-3: hux
- Glottolog: nupo1240
- ELP: Nipode
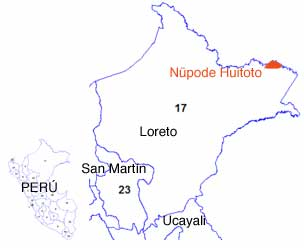
- Nüpode Huitoto

Nüpode Huitoto or Nɨpode is an indigenous American language spoken in western South America. It has occasionally been referred to as Muinane Witoto, not to be confused with the Muinane language.

== Classification ==
Nüpode Huitoto belongs to the Witotoan language family. Along with Mɨnɨca and Murai, it is one of the three Witoto Proper languages.

== Geographic distribution ==
Nüpode Huitoto is spoken by just 100 people in Peru's northeastern Loreto province, where it has official standing. Speakers also use the other two Huitoto languages (Murui and Minica). It is written using the Roman alphabet and has had some Bible portions translated into it. In addition, a dictionary and grammar have been written.

== Phonology ==
=== Consonants ===
	Bilabial	Alveolar	Postalveolar/ Palatal	Velar	Glottal
Nasal	m	n	ɲ	ŋ	
Plosive	p b	t d	tʃ dʒ	k ɡ	ʔ
Implosive	ɓ	ɗ			
Fricative	β				h
Flap		r			

=== Vowels ===
Muinane vowel phonemes
	Front	Central	Back
High	i	ɨ	u
Low	e	a	o
