= Penicillium araracuarense =

Scientific classification
- Kingdom: Fungi
- Division: Ascomycota
- Class: Eurotiomycetes
- Order: Eurotiales
- Family: Aspergillaceae
- Genus: Penicillium
- Species: P. araracuarense

Binomial name
- Penicillium araracuarense Houbraken, C. Lpez, Frisvad & Samson 2011

Species of fungus

Penicillium araracuarense is a fungus species of the genus Penicillium which was isolated from soil from the Colombian Amazon forest. It is named after the type locality, Araracuara, a remote settlement where the type specimen was collected.

== See also ==
- List of Penicillium species
