= Pastoral and Environmental Network in the Horn of Africa =

International NGO focused on Horn of Africa

The Pastoral and Environmental Network in the Horn of Africa (PENHA) is an international NGO founded in 1989 by professionals from the Horn of Africa to address pastoral and agro-pastoral development from a regional perspective and promote global cross-learning. Headquartered in London, PENHA has offices in Ethiopia and Somaliland and partnerships in Eritrea, Sudan, and Uganda.

PENHA's founding director, Zeremariam Fre, a Global Reconciliation Desmond Tutu Fellow, serves on the Board of Trustees along with other Senior Advisers, including Mitiku Haile from Mekelle University, who won the 2021 World Agriculture Prize. Joanna Lumley, as PENHA's patron, has been a dedicated supporter

== Mission ==
In 2020, PENHA launched its five-year strategy, Building Sustainable Futures. It focuses on four key areas: (i) policy and advocacy; (ii) program creation; (iii) research; and (iv) consultancy and networking, operating at local, national, regional, and international levels in collaboration with partners. PENHA is also enhancing its efforts with young refugees and asylum seekers in the United Kingdom, examining the connections between migration, climate change, future aspirations, and social integration.

PENHA's primary goals are gender equality, peacebuilding, and community cohesion. According to Danida's appraisal of the 'Women in Africa' regional assistance effort, PENHA has supported women's organizations in Uganda, Sudan, and Somaliland through its Women Economic Empowerment Programme (WEEP)."

== Projects ==
=== Ethiopia ===
PENHA opened a new office in Addis Ababa in 2020, having had a regional office at Addis Ababa University from 1994-98. PENHA currently works with its partner Tropenbos International on drylands restoration and strengthening livelihoods. Among other activities, in 2022, Ethiopia's first national dryland strategy was endorsed by the government as a result of this collaboration.

From 2018 to 2021, PENHA was part of a research consortium with the Development Planning Unit (DPU) at University College London (UCL), Adigrat University (ADU) in Ethiopia, and the Knowledge Platform on Inclusive Development Policies (INCLUDE), based in the Netherlands. The consortium carried out action research with pastoral and agro-pastoral communities in the Afar Region of Ethiopia as part of the Social Protection for Inclusive Development in Afar (SPIDA) research project, funded by the Netherlands Organisation for Scientific Research (NWO). The project evaluated existing social protection policies and practices, including the Ethiopian government’s Productive Safety Net Programme (PSNP), and explored alternative policy options to help alleviate poverty among the Afar agro-pastoral and pastoral communities, to accelerate the process of livelihood improvement and design ways to achieve inclusive development through social protection measures. The findings were presented at a conference at Adigrat University on 26 November 2017 entitled SPIDA Conference: Social Protection as a Pathway for Inclusive Development. The research project has cumulated in a book published in August 2022 by Routledge entitled Social Protection, Pastoralism and Resilience in Ethiopia: Lessons for Sub-Saharan Africa.

In collaboration with Pastoralist Concern Association Ethiopia (PCAE), PENHA delivered the ‘Pastoralist Health Extension Project (PHEP)’ in Filtu district of Liban zone in Somali Regional State of eastern Ethiopia between 2001-2005, funded by the National Lottery Community Fund International Grants Programme. This focused mainly "on health system quality improvement and ethno veterinary study on commonly used herbal medicine".

=== Somaliland ===
PENHA's regional office is located in Somaliland's capital, Hargeisa. PENHA is a member of the Somalia NGO Consortium. PENHA is currently working in Berbera with Seawater Greenhouse UK and Aston University on an innovative solar-powered desalination unit in a greenhouse which extracts irrigation water and sea salt and grows vegetables for the benefit of local communities. Its current project is a consortium with the Belmont Forum, funded by the Swedish International Development Cooperation Agency (Sida) on mineral extraction from seawater desalination brine and seawater greenhouse farming (Salt-Mine).

PENHA also works with FAO on Prosopis juliflora control and use, with enterprise promotion, in particular on a project entitled “Supporting communities in Somaliland to ‘make prosopis make money’ through Cash-For-Work (CFW) and small business development" in Berbera, Odweyne and Burao districts.

PENHA continues to engage with the German Agency for International Cooperation (GIZ) on livelihoods and resilience, with a focus on gender and youth. An action plan on Prosopis juliflora management, which grew out of GIZ’s regional “Dream Conference” in Ethiopia, provided guidance for policy based on control and use.

PENHA staff contributed a chapter on `Utlisation of Prosopis juliflora in the Horn of Africa: Recent Developments' in a book entitled Prosopis as a Heat Tolerant Nitrogen Fixing Desert Food Legume: Prospects for Economic Development in Arid Lands in 2021.

PENHA works with the United Nations Democracy Fund (UNDEF) on "Strengthening Women’s Political Representation in Somaliland", which aims to strengthen the capacity of women’s organisations and leaders and address women’s political marginalisation. Women trained under the project became prominent in the build-up towards elections, with a strong push for a women’s quota in parliament and in local administrations. This follows on from a regional Women's Economic Empowerment programme that PENHA undertook in 2007, funded by the Danish International Development Agency (DANIDA).

=== Sudan ===
PENHA collaborates with the Pastoralist Environment Association in Kassala State (PEAKS), the Animal Production and Resource Centre (APRC) and the Khartoum- and Kassala-based universities. Since the early 2000s, PENHA has been working with APRC and PEAKS on the alternative use of Prosopis juliflora through conducting evidence-based research to improve the livestock productivity in Sudan and beyond.

With financial support from Global Reconciliation's Desmond Tutu Fellowship Award, PEAKS and PENHA organised a regional conference at the end of 2019 on ‘Enhancing cross-border cohesion and reconciliation among pastoral communities along the borders of Ethiopia, Eritrea and Eastern Sudan’ in Kassala, Eastern Sudan. This was an important opportunity to promote reconciliation efforts, given Kassala’s geographical location near the Eritrean border and engage with women’s cooperatives in eastern Sudan. PENHA is currently exploring collaboration with the Regional Centre for Training and Development of Civil Society to promote community cohesion and conflict prevention among pastoralists and farmers, particularly in border areas.

=== Uganda ===
In Uganda, PENHA works through its Focal Point Person, Elizabeth Katushabe, who represents PENHA at national and international meetings, where PENHA is also a member of the Coalition for Pastoralist Civil Society Organization (COPASCO). In 2019, she was interviewed by a broadcast journalist from BBC World Service TV Smart Money on a story about the business built around the horns of the Ankole long horn cattle. Elizabeth is an Ankole cow conservationist, who advocates on the values of the Ankole cattle and their social, cultural and economic importance among their traditional keepers. Elizabeth has recently been involved in a high level dialogue on managing natural resources in the rangelands, hosted by the Uganda Food Rights Alliance (FRA).

=== UK ===
PENHA collaborated on a global action project in 2014 on `Food We Want - Sustainable, Local and Fair', funded by the European Union, to support the critical role of sustainable agriculture to ensure food security and environmental protection. The project was implemented by partners in Europe and Africa: Italy, Kenya, Mozambique, Poland, Portugal, Spain and Tanzania and the UK. In 2012, PENHA, in partnership with the International Institute for Environment and Development (IIED), organised the project launch in London. The official project announcement included a panel discussion on food security with a special focus on African small scale producers. The main aims of the project were to share ideas and solutions and raise public awareness on the future of food.

Currently, PENHA is working on the integration of young asylum seekers and migrants from the Horn of Africa in the county of Kent in the south-east of England, on a programme of work funded by the United Kingdom National Lottery Community Fund.
