= Witoto =

South American Indigenous people

Witoto Huitoto
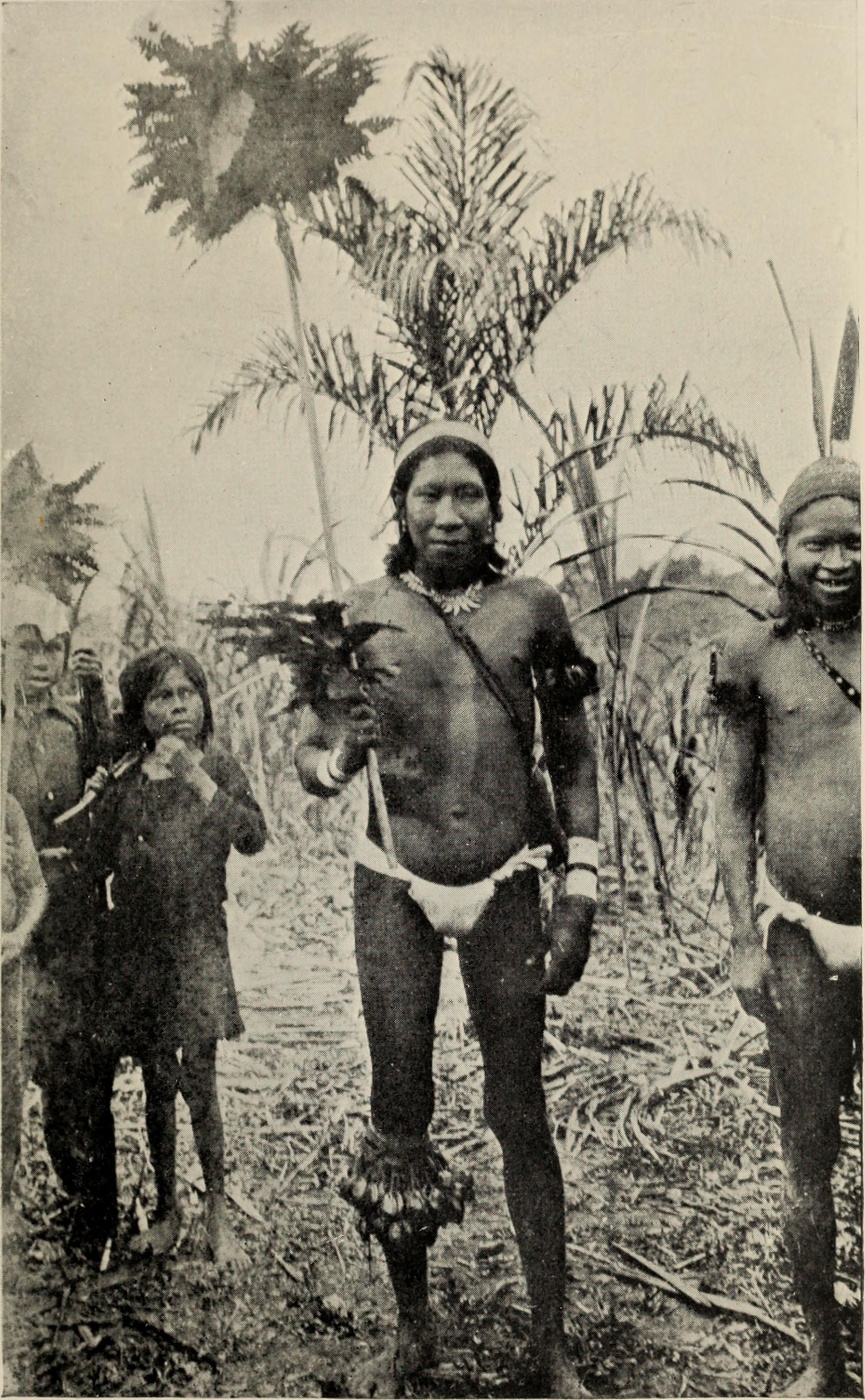
- Witoto people in 1913

Total population
- 8,500

Regions with significant populations
- Colombia, Peru

Languages
- Witotoan languages: Ocaina language (oca), Witoto Proper: Minica Huitoto (hto), Murui Huitoto (huu), Nüpode (hux)

Religion
- traditional tribal religion

The Witoto (also Huitoto or Uitoto) are an Indigenous people in southern Colombia and northern Peru.

One of the largest groupings within the Witoto people is the Murui Muina, also known as Muina Murui, peoples.

== History ==
The Witoto people (also spelt Huitoto or Uitoto) are a grouping of indigenous peoples in the Amazon basin, in areas now in northern Peru and southern Colombia.

They were once composed of 100 villages or 31 tribes, but disease and conflict have reduced their numbers. The Witoto first experienced contact with Europeans at the beginning of the 17th century. However, contact remained sporadic into the 19th century. At the early 20th century, Witoto population was 50,000. The rubber boom in the mid-20th century brought diseases and displacement to the Witotos, causing their numbers to plummet to 7,000–10,000. The rubber boom also increased outside interest in the caucho extraction due to the surge in production and demand. In the Witoto region, Julio Cesar Arana was one of the main figures of the rubber industry. He founded the Peruvian Amazon Company, a business that extracted and sold Amazonian caucho rubber. The company relied on Indigenous, including Witoto, labor, and he kept his workers in unending servitude through constant debt and physical torture. His practices had such a large negative impact on the surrounding Indigenous nations that, by the time the company’s work ended, Indigenous populations in the area had declined by more than half of their original numbers.

Since the 1990s, cattle ranchers have invaded Witoto lands, depleted the soil, and polluted the waterways. In response to the incursions, the Colombian government established several reservations for Witotos.

== Subsistence ==
Witoto peoples practice swidden or slash-and-burn agriculture. To prevent depleting the land, they relocate their fields every few yields. Major crops include cacao, coca, maize, bitter and sweet manioc, bananas, mangoes, palms, pineapples, plantains, sugar cane, sweet potatoes, and yams. Tobacco and peanuts are also cultivated in small quantities. Ethnobotanists have studied Witoto agriculture due to its efficiency and sustainability.

Witoto men hunt with blowguns and shotguns. In 2023, four children, one less than a year old, managed to survive 40 days in the jungle after their plane had crashed. The plane crash killed all adults, including their mother. Observers suggested that the lore they picked up from their kin earlier had helped them to forage for enough food to subsist on.

== Culture ==
Traditionally the Witoto are divided into a number of groups. The largest group are the Murui, who live on the western end of their historical territory. Another group, the Muinane, traditionally lived to the east of the Murui. Historically they were a large group but most were gradually absorbed into the Murui. The grouping is often referred to as "Muina Murui" (the language being "Murui-Muinanɨ", or "Murui Muina". In Colombia, there is the Association of Murui Muina Town Councils of the Upper Caquetá river basin, or ASCAINCA (Spanish). Living along the Caquetá River, one of their neighbouring tribes is the Koreguaje.

A third group, the Meneca, live in the Putumayo and Ampiyacu riversheds. There are also a number of significantly smaller groups.

Traditionally, the Witoto people lived according to their patrilineal lineage. This practice is less common today, although some elders in the community continue the tradition. They live in communal houses known as joforomo or maloca that several families share. Every family has an independent sector where they can hang their hammocks. Their diets consist mainly of Casabe, arepas made with yuca brava flour, and protein from hunting and fishing.

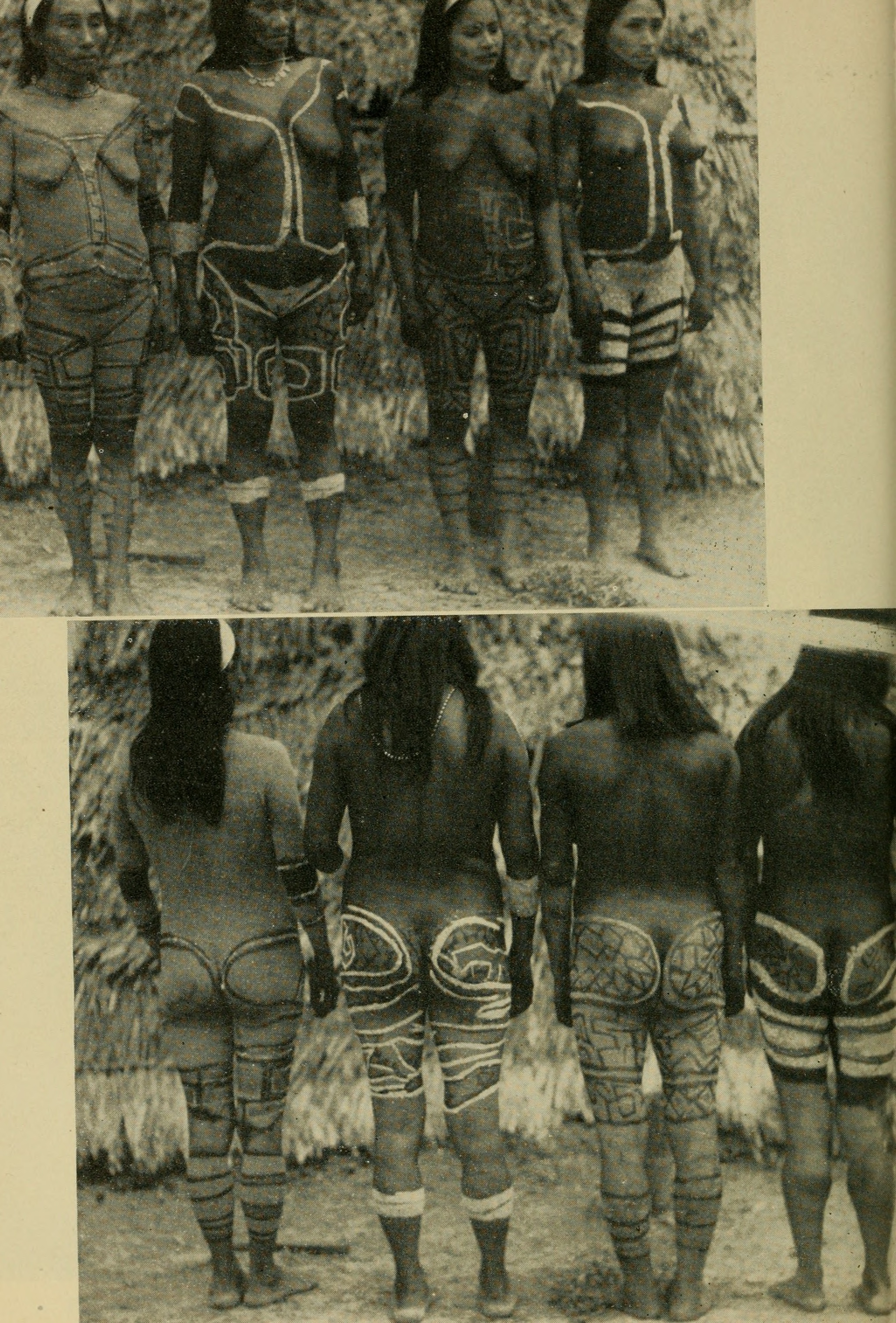
Witoto women's body painting

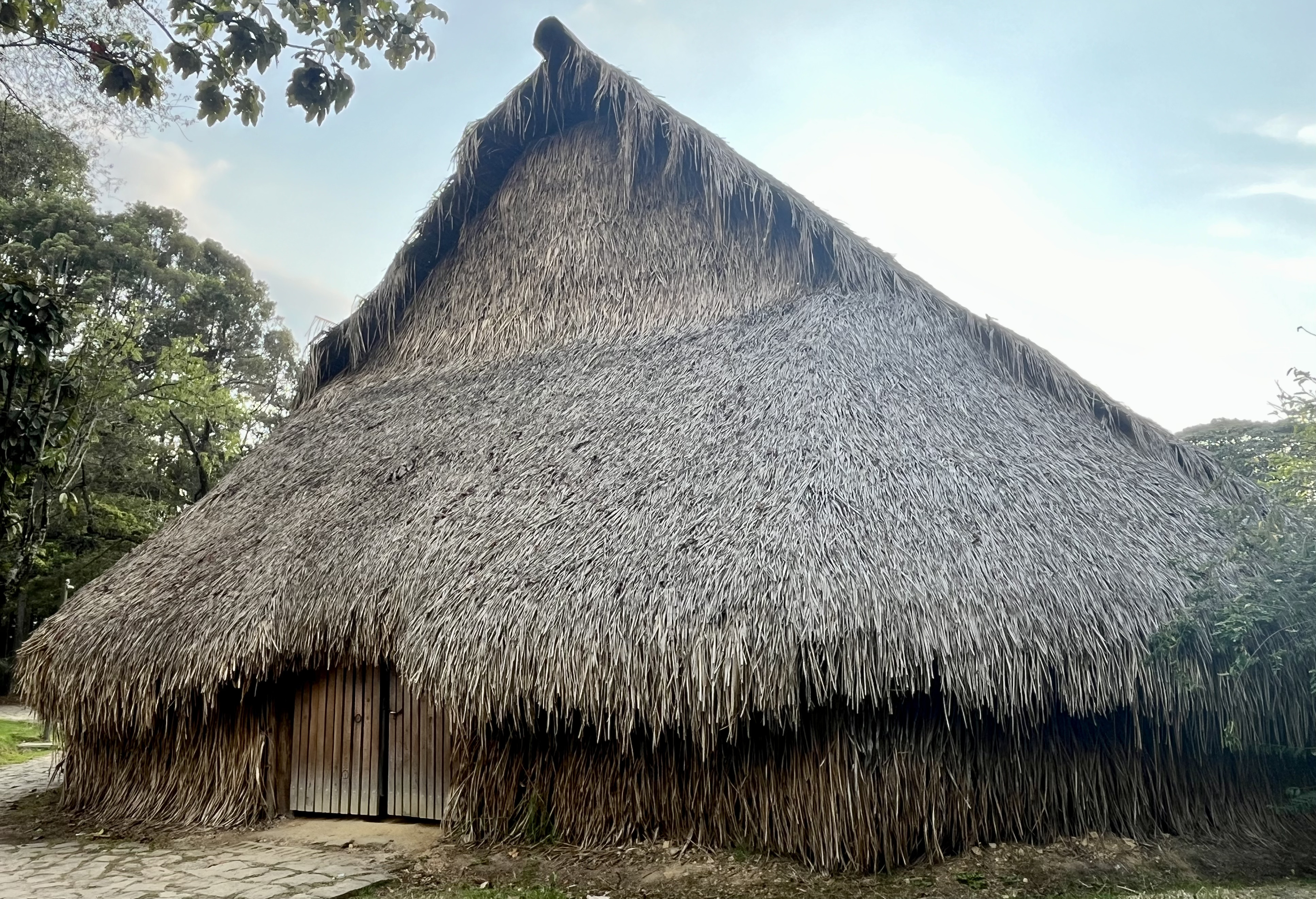
A typical maloca house

In their maloca, men have a specific place where they can consume an ancestral green powder called mambe, or jiibie. This powder is made from coca leaves and the ashes of yarumo.

Traditionally, when Witoto men consume mambe they play drums called Maguare, which can be heard kilometers away. The purpose of these drums is to communicate with nearby tribes.

== Language ==
Funded by the Modern Endangered Archives Program at the UCLA library, the Universidad Nacional de Colombia digitized a large collection of recordings from three indigenous groups of the Colombian Amazon including the Magütá, Miraña and Murui. These three endangered languages have been collected and stored in order to maintain oral histories and traditions of these indigenous groups. These recordings are available digitally through the UCLA library.

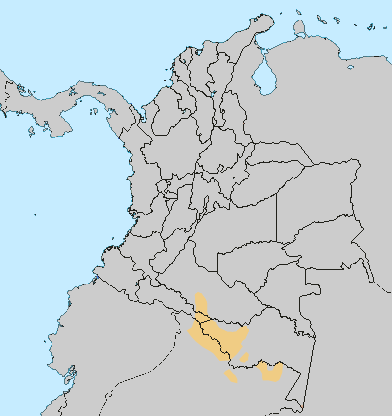
Bora- Witoto Language

== Notable people ==
- María Clemencia Herrera Nemerayema (born 1968), indigenous, women rights and biodiversity activist
- Abel Rodríguez (died 2025), artist

== Gallery ==
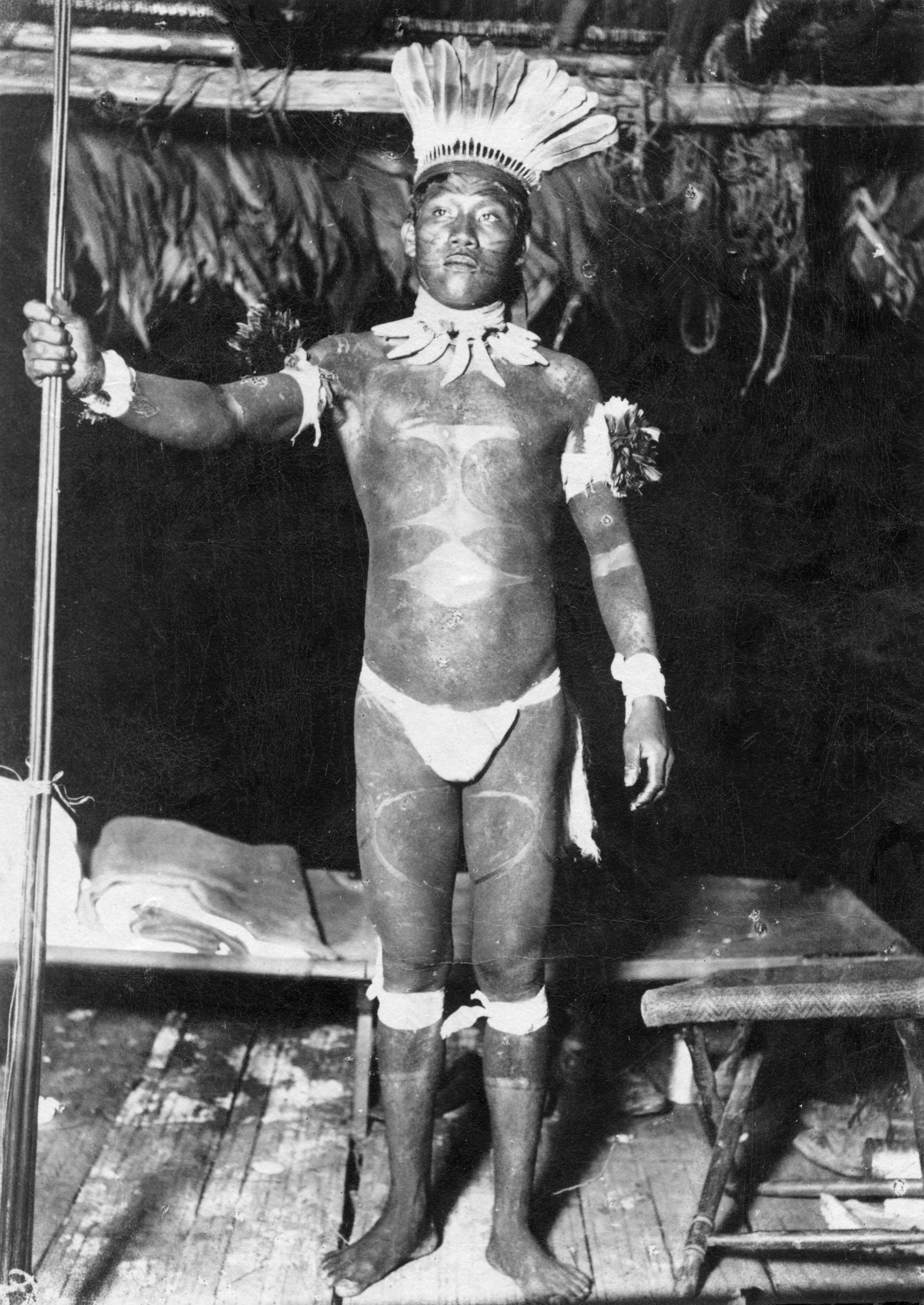
A male dancer for the okima festival, Colombia, 1914

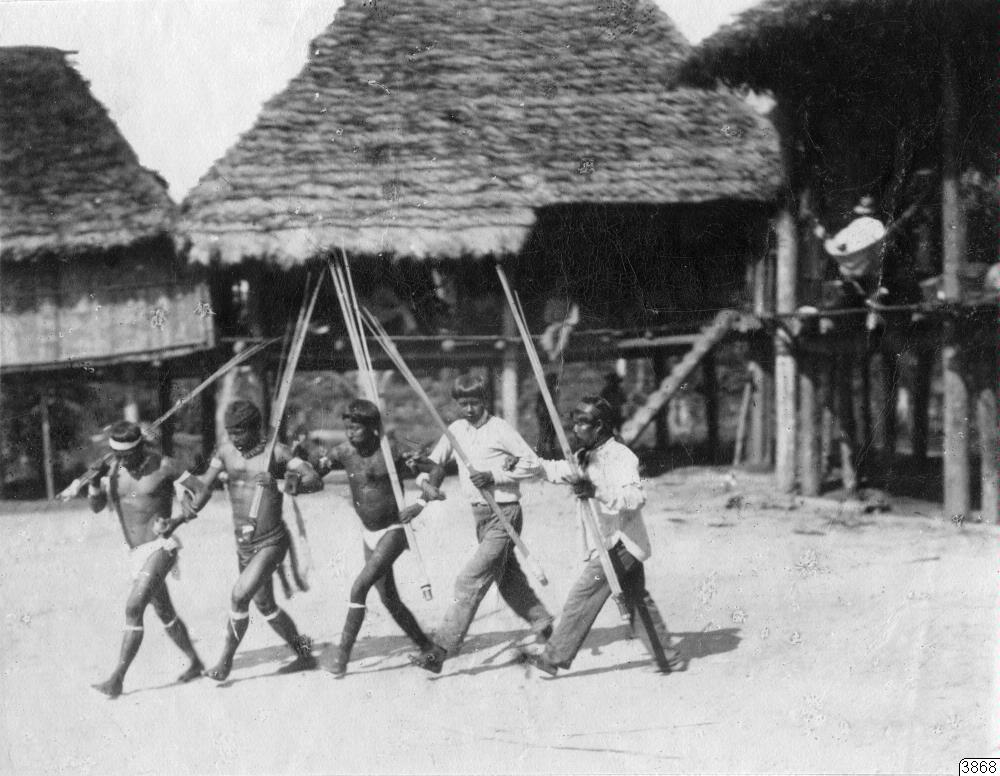
Dancing at the okima festival in the village of Niña Maria

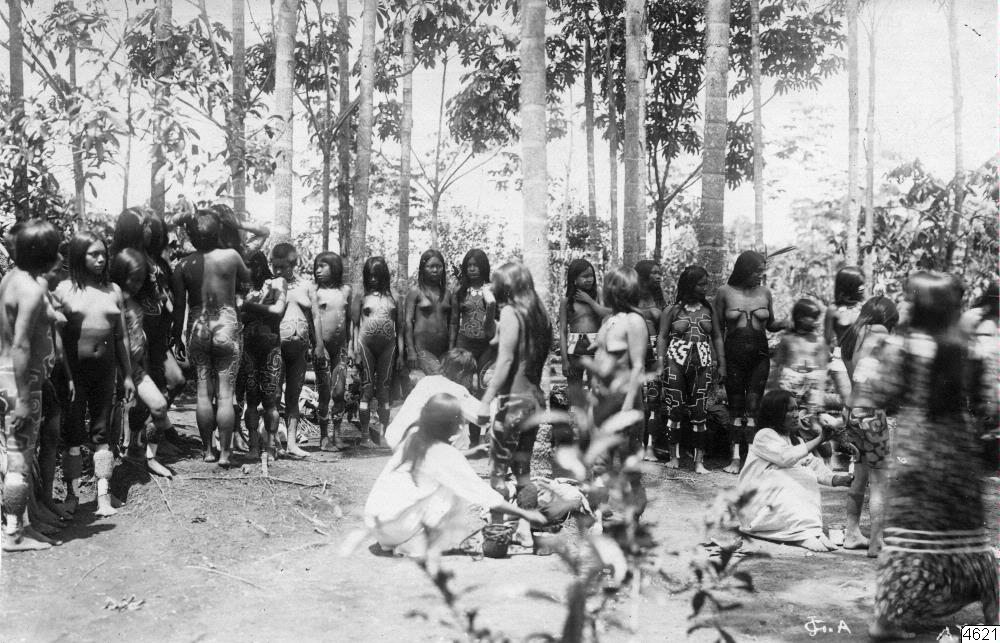
Women preparing for celebration through body painting

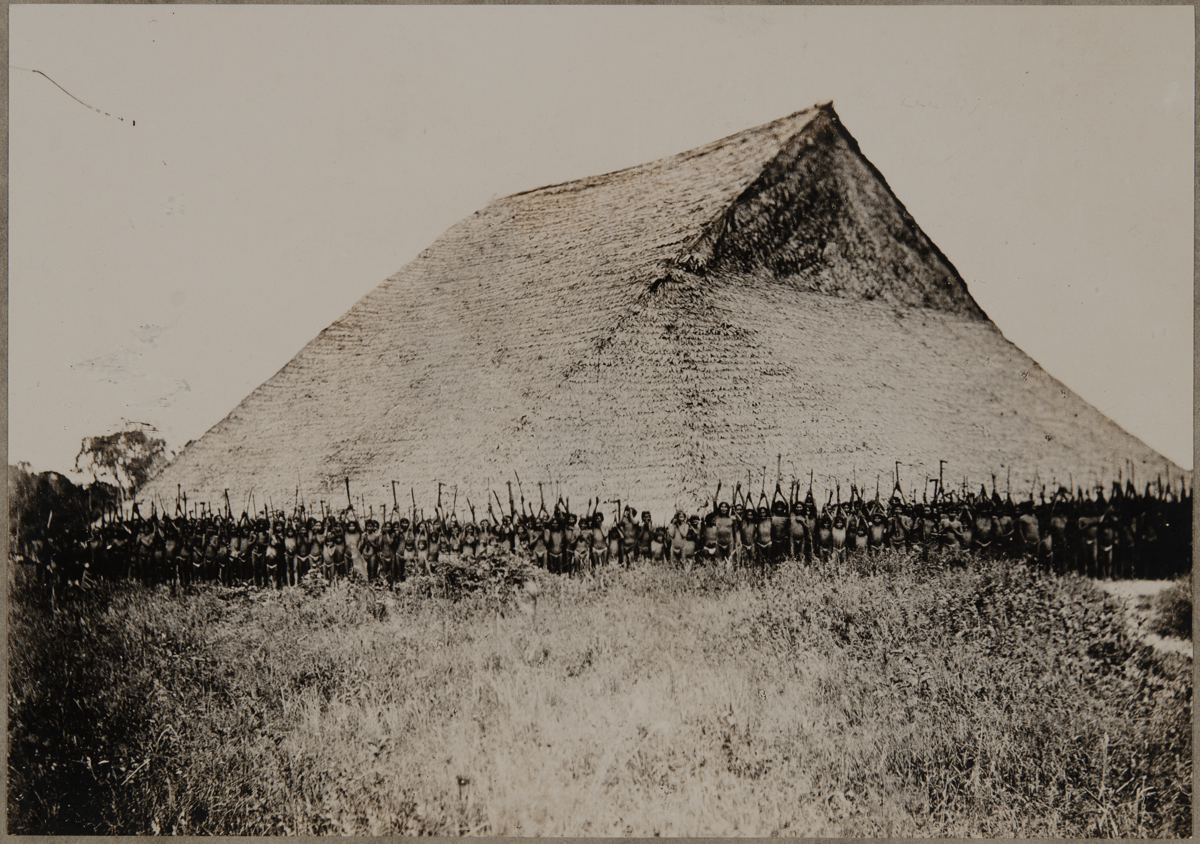
Witoto men and children lined up in front of a malocca, holding aloft axes
