= Solano, Caquetá =

Coordinates: 0°41′54″N 75°15′14″W

Solano
- Municipality and town
- Flag Coat of arms

- Location of the municipality and town of Solano in the Caquetá Department of Colombia.
- Country: Colombia
- Department: Caquetá Department

Population (Census 2018)
  - Total: 10,331
- Time zone: UTC-5 (Colombia Standard Time)

Solano is a town and municipality in Caquetá Department, Colombia.

== Climate ==
Climate data for Solano (Araracuara), elevation 150 m (490 ft), (1981–2010)
Month	Jan	Feb	Mar	Apr	May	Jun	Jul	Aug	Sep	Oct	Nov	Dec	Year
Mean daily maximum °C (°F)	31.9 (89.4)	31.8 (89.2)	31.6 (88.9)	30.9 (87.6)	30.2 (86.4)	29.6 (85.3)	29.7 (85.5)	30.7 (87.3)	31.4 (88.5)	31.5 (88.7)	31.5 (88.7)	31.8 (89.2)	31.1 (88.0)
Daily mean °C (°F)	26.1 (79.0)	26.4 (79.5)	26.4 (79.5)	25.9 (78.6)	25.5 (77.9)	25.2 (77.4)	24.9 (76.8)	25.4 (77.7)	25.9 (78.6)	26.1 (79.0)	26.0 (78.8)	26.3 (79.3)	25.8 (78.4)
Mean daily minimum °C (°F)	22.0 (71.6)	22.1 (71.8)	22.3 (72.1)	22.4 (72.3)	22.3 (72.1)	21.8 (71.2)	21.3 (70.3)	21.4 (70.5)	21.8 (71.2)	22.1 (71.8)	22.4 (72.3)	22.2 (72.0)	22.0 (71.6)
Average precipitation mm (inches)	152.0 (5.98)	199.1 (7.84)	262.1 (10.32)	395.6 (15.57)	413.6 (16.28)	358.6 (14.12)	332.5 (13.09)	263.3 (10.37)	255.5 (10.06)	261.3 (10.29)	243.3 (9.58)	200.0 (7.87)	3,337 (131.38)
Average precipitation days	14	15	18	22	24	24	23	21	19	17	18	15	220
Average relative humidity (%)	85	86	87	88	88	89	89	86	86	86	87	86	87
Mean monthly sunshine hours	155.0	141.2	130.2	126.0	124.0	123.0	142.6	164.3	159.0	164.3	159.0	164.3	1,752.9
Mean daily sunshine hours	5.0	5.0	4.2	4.2	4.0	4.1	4.6	5.3	5.3	5.3	5.3	5.3	4.8
Source: Instituto de Hidrologia Meteorologia y Estudios Ambientales

Climate data for Solano (Tres Esquinas), elevation 219 m (719 ft), (1981–2010)
Month	Jan	Feb	Mar	Apr	May	Jun	Jul	Aug	Sep	Oct	Nov	Dec	Year
Mean daily maximum °C (°F)	32.6 (90.7)	31.8 (89.2)	30.7 (87.3)	30.2 (86.4)	29.8 (85.6)	29.3 (84.7)	29.3 (84.7)	30.3 (86.5)	31.1 (88.0)	31.4 (88.5)	31.5 (88.7)	31.8 (89.2)	30.8 (87.4)
Daily mean °C (°F)	27.1 (80.8)	26.3 (79.3)	25.8 (78.4)	25.5 (77.9)	25.4 (77.7)	24.7 (76.5)	24.6 (76.3)	25.0 (77.0)	25.6 (78.1)	25.8 (78.4)	26.2 (79.2)	26.6 (79.9)	25.7 (78.3)
Mean daily minimum °C (°F)	20.6 (69.1)	20.5 (68.9)	20.9 (69.6)	20.8 (69.4)	21.1 (70.0)	20.5 (68.9)	20.4 (68.7)	20.3 (68.5)	20.5 (68.9)	20.6 (69.1)	20.8 (69.4)	20.4 (68.7)	20.6 (69.1)
Average precipitation mm (inches)	97.8 (3.85)	143.3 (5.64)	201.7 (7.94)	315.0 (12.40)	317.9 (12.52)	335.2 (13.20)	241.7 (9.52)	221.4 (8.72)	203.8 (8.02)	186.1 (7.33)	150.3 (5.92)	143.9 (5.67)	2,485.8 (97.87)
Average relative humidity (%)	80	82	86	87	88	89	88	86	85	86	85	82	86
Mean monthly sunshine hours	179.8	118.6	108.5	99.0	105.4	102.0	120.9	133.3	144.0	164.3	159.0	186.0	1,620.8
Mean daily sunshine hours	5.8	4.2	3.5	3.3	3.4	3.4	3.9	4.3	4.8	5.3	5.3	6.0	4.4
Source: Instituto de Hidrologia Meteorologia y Estudios Ambientales
