= Puerto Santander, Amazonas =

Puerto Santander
- Municipality and town
- Location of the municipality and town of Puerto Santander, Amazonas in the Amazonas Department of Colombia

- Location in Colombia
- Coordinates: 0°37′9″S 72°23′0″W
- Country: Colombia
- Department: Amazonas Department
- Time zone: UTC-5 (Colombia Standard Time)
- Climate: Af

Puerto Santander is a town and municipality in the Colombian Department of Amazonas. The economy relies on fishing, farming and, to a lesser extent, on hunting.
