= Abel Rodríguez (artist) =

Colombian visual artist (died 2025)

- Born: Mogaje Guihu; Between 1934 and 1941; La Chorrera, Colombia
- Died: 9 April 2025 (aged 83–91); Bogotá, Colombia
- Other names: Don Abel
- Known for: Drawings of the Amazon rainforest

Abel Rodríguez (died 9 April 2025), also known as Don Abel, was a Colombian visual artist from the Nonuya and Muinane communities known for his depictions of the Amazon rainforest.

== Life ==
Rodríguez was born Mogaje Guihu (Muinane: "shining sparrow-hawk feathers"), along the Cahuinari River or the Igara Paraná River in La Chorrera, Colombia, between 1934 and 1941. He was Nonuya and was raised in a Muinane community, where his uncle taught him about plants and the ecological and cosmological relationships that they had with the environment and animals. He used his uncle's knowledge to help his people manage their chagra with a two-year farming system during which plants were extracted and then raised anew. He became recognized as a "plant namer" of his community, noting in a 2024 interview, "My knowledge is not biological. It is materially, spiritually, and sentimentally connected to the rainforest, to its energy". He also studied shamanism, but did not complete his traditional education after he left to attend a local boarding school.

In 1959, Mogaje Guihu took the name Abel Rodríguez, as official registration of village residents required a Spanish-language name. As an adult, he worked as a farmer and rubber tapper. In the 1980s, Rodríguez became involved with Dutch NGO Fundación Tropenbos Colombia, helping them to support the country's biodiversity by identifying local plants, including plants that could be used for medical purposes, and working as a guide.

Following conflicts in the 1990s with the Revolutionary Armed Forces of Colombia, Rodríguez and his partner, Doña Elisa, relocated to a poor neighborhood in Bogotá. It was here that he began making art, with support from biologist Carlos Rodríguez, with whom he had worked at Fundación Tropenbos Colombia. His pieces focused on Amazonian flora and fauna and were created from memory; a curator noted in 2020 that "he did drawings of particular trees in which he describes the color of the bark, the color of the leaves, at what time of year the fruit comes out and which animals eat the fruit, whether for food, or as a pest". However, Rodríguez was careful to limit his depictions to honor cultural restrictions on access to information on plants and animals. His early pieces used felt tip pens, but he later switched to Chinese ink.

Rodríguez first became known in the wider art world in 2008, when he appeared in a show at the Museo Botero in Bogotá. Several years later, he exhibited outside the country, in the show Sakahàn: International Indigenous Art at the National Gallery of Canada. He had his first institutional solo show at the Baltic Centre for Contemporary Art in Gateshead, England, in 2020. He also exhibited at Documenta 14 (2017), the Biennale of Sydney, the 2019 Toronto Biennial of Art, the Carnegie International, the 2021 São Paulo Art Biennial, the 2023 Gwangju Biennale, and the 2024 Venice Biennale. His work at the Venice Biennale was exhibited alongside work by his son, Aycoobo. As he became more widely recognized, Rodríguez focused on commercial art rather than working with NGOs.

Rodríguez died in Bogotá on 9 April 2025. At the time of his death, he lived with his partner, Doña Elisa, and had three children.

== Awards and honours ==
- Prince Claus Laureate 2014
- Art Prize, 2019 Toronto Biennial of Art
