= Witoto language =

Language family of Colombia and Peru

Witoto
- Huitoto
- Region: Colombia and Peru
- Ethnicity: Witoto peoples
- Native speakers: 7,400–8,200 (2004)
- Language family: Witotoan: Witoto
- Dialects: Minica; Murui; Nüpode
- Writing system: Latin

Language codes
- ISO 639-3: Variously: hto – Minica huu – Murui hux – Nüpode
- Glottolog: nucl1659

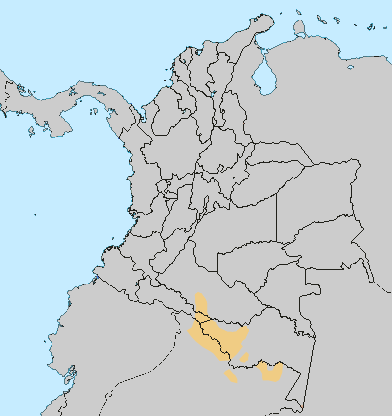
Where Witoto is spoken

Witoto, Huitoto or Uitoto is an indigenous American language spoken by the Witoto people, an indigenous group living in Colombia and in the neighbouring region of northern Peru. It is part of the Witotoan language family.
