= Murui Huitoto language =

Witotoan language of Peru and Colombia

Murui
- Bue
- Native to: Colombia, Peru
- Native speakers: 1,000 (2008)
- Language family: Bora–Witoto ?: Witoto–Ocaina; Witoto; Mɨnɨca–Murui; Murui

Language codes
- ISO 639-3: huu
- Glottolog: muru1274
- ELP: Murui Huitoto
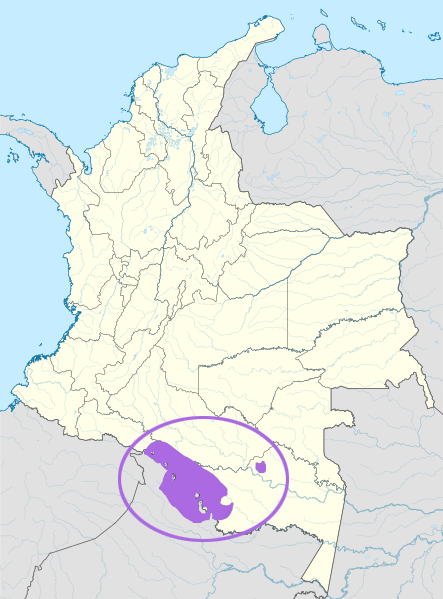

Murui Huitoto (or simply Murui), also known as Bue, Witoto Murui, or Witoto, is an indigenous American Huitoto language of the Witotoan family, spoken by one of the Witoto peoples of Colombia and Peru in South America.

== Overview ==
Murui is spoken by about 1,100 Murui people along the banks of the Putumayo, Cara-Paraná, and Igara-Paraná rivers in Colombia. In Peru it is spoken in the North alongside the Ampiyacu and Napo rivers by some 1,000 people. Some Murui speakers live also outside their territories, for instance the vicinity of Leticia, Amazonas, Colombia.

Approximately 1,000 Peruvians use Murui in both its written and oral forms. The language is accorded official status and is used in schools. It is also used in churches. There are no Murui-an monolinguals in Peru: speakers of the language who do not also use another language. The language has 1,900 speakers in southwestern Colombia where it has higher social utility and standing. It was formerly spoken in Brazil, but is now extinct in that country.

Murui uses the Roman script. There is a dictionary of the Murui language (Murui-Spanish and Spanish-Murui) compiled by SIL linguist Shirley Burtch (1983), and a number of works concerning its grammar (Petersen de Piñeros 1994, Petersen de Piñeros & Patiño: 2000, Wojtylak 2012).

Katarzyna Wojtylak published a full referential grammar of Murui (2017, PhD thesis written at James Cook University) published by Brill Publishers (2020).

== Phonology ==
Murui has a relatively small inventory of 16 contrastive consonantal phonemes some of which have restricted phonotactics. Murui consonant inventory is similar to two other dialects of Witoto, Mɨka and Mɨnɨka. The vowel inventory of the language is based on a six vowel system that consist of, among other sounds, the high central vowel ɨ. This trait is typical for languages from Northwest Amazonia, such as Tucanoan and Carib languages (Aikhenvald, 2012).

=== Consonants ===
The orthographic representation is to the left; the IPA to the right.

		Bilabial	Dental	Alveolar	Palatal	Velar	Glottal
Plosive/ Affricate	voiceless	p ⟨p⟩ (Note: /p/ is a marginal phoneme.)	t ⟨t⟩		tʃ ⟨ch⟩	k ⟨k⟩	
Plosive/ Affricate	voiced	b ⟨b⟩	d ⟨d⟩		dʒ ⟨y⟩	ɡ ⟨g⟩	
Fricative	voiceless	ɸ ⟨f⟩	θ ⟨z⟩	s ⟨s⟩ (Note: /s/ is only used from Spanish.)			h ⟨j⟩
Fricative	voiced	β ⟨v⟩					
Nasal		m ⟨m⟩	n ⟨n⟩		ɲ ⟨ñ⟩		
Tap				ɾ ⟨r⟩			
Semivowel		w ⟨u⟩			j ⟨i⟩	ɰ ⟨ɨ⟩	

=== Vowels ===
	Front	Central	Back
Close	i ⟨i⟩ iː ⟨ii⟩	ɯ ⟨ɨ⟩ ɯː ⟨ɨɨ⟩	u ⟨u⟩ uː ⟨uu⟩
Mid	ɛ ⟨e⟩ ɛː ⟨ee⟩		ɔ ⟨o⟩ ɔː ⟨oo⟩
Open		a ⟨a⟩ aː ⟨aa⟩	

Close vowels /i, ɯ, u/ in word-initial position are heard as glides /j, ɰ, w/.

== Orthography ==
Throughout the years, the existing phonological analyses of the language have come to reflect different spelling variations with various graphemes used to describe the Witoto sounds. The first to analyze and describe the sound system of Witoto Mɨnɨka was Minor Eugene (Minor 1956). This description was fundamental to the development of the language orthography. Nowadays, there is a tendency to use the graphemes introduced by Petersen de Piñeros (1994). Wojtylak (2017, 2020) uses slightly modified spellings.

== Morphosyntax ==
Murui is highly synthetic, predominantly suffixing and nominative-accusative. The language is predominantly verb-final; the organization of the constituents in the clause is usually SV/AOV. Grammatical relations are expressed through pronouns cross-referencing on the verb (with one cross-referencing position: the subject S/A). Syntactic functions can be expressed through case markers. Marking of core arguments (S, A, O = non S/A focus) is generally optional and is related to focus; marking of peripheral arguments on an NP (i.e. locative, ablative, comitative-instrumental, benefactive, privative) is usually mandatory.

Murui has three open lexical classes (nouns, verbs and derived adjectives (that can also be referred to as 'descriptive verbs')). Closed classes of words are underived adjectives and quantifiers, adverbs, pronouns, demonstratives, anaphoric forms, interrogative words, low (1 and 2) and lexicalized (3 < 20) number words, connectives, adpositions, interjections and onomatopoeic forms.

The majority of the word classes can occupy the predicate slot but there are restrictions as to what kind of sets of suffixes can be attached to non-verbs. Quantifiers, connectives, adpositions, interjections and onomatopoeic forms cannot function predicatively.

One of the most salient characteristics of the nominal morphology of Murui is a large multiple classifier system that consists of at least 80 classifiers. The same (or almost the same) classifier form can be used in a variety of morphosyntactic contexts (hence the label 'multiple classifier system'). The system is semi-open due to the occurrence of repeaters (partially repeated nouns that occur in classifier slots). All types of classifiers are bound suffixes that can be either mono- or disyllabic.

== See also ==
- Witoto people
- Witoto languages
- Indigenous peoples in Colombia
- Indigenous languages of the Americas
