= Minica Huitoto language =

Indigenous American Huitoto language

Minica Huitoto
- Mɨnɨka
- Native to: Colombia, Peru
- Native speakers: 1,500 (2008)
- Language family: Bora–Witoto ?: Witoto–Ocaina; Witoto; Minica–Murui; Minica Huitoto

Language codes
- ISO 639-3: hto
- Glottolog: mini1256
- ELP: Minica Huitoto
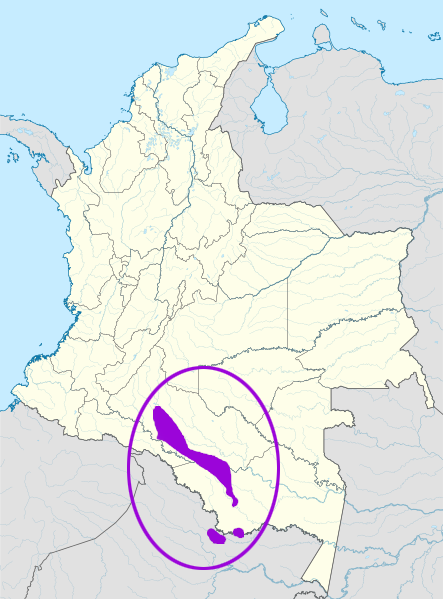

Minica Huitoto (Mɨnɨka) is one of three indigenous American Huitoto languages of the Witotoan family spoken by a few thousand speakers in western South America.

It is spoken in the Upper Igara-Paraná river area, along the Caquetá River at the Isla de los Monos, and the Caguán River near San Vicente del Caguán. There is 75% literacy in Colombia and 85% are literate in Spanish; most are bilingual. There is a dictionary and grammar rules.

There are only five speakers in Peru, where it has official standing within its community.

== Phonology ==
=== Vowels ===
Vowels
	Front	Central	Back	
Close	i		ɯ	u
Mid	ɛ		ɔ	
Open		a		

However, Ávila's 2018 analysis yields a different chart.

Vowels
	Front	Central	Back
Close	i	ɨ	u
Mid	e		o
Open		a	

=== Consonants ===
Consonants
		Labial	Dental/ Alveolar	Palatal	Velar	Glottal
Stop	voiceless	p	t	tʃ	k	ʔ
Stop	voiced	b	d	dʒ	ɡ	
Nasal		m	n	ɲ	ŋ	
Fricative	voiceless	ɸ	θ		x	
Fricative	voiced	β				
Tap			ɾ			

- Stops /b/, /d/, and /ɡ/ may be prenasalized as [ᵐb], [ⁿd], and [ᵑɡ] in word-initial position.
- Labial consonants /b/, /ɸ/, /m/ may also be heard as labialized [bʷ], [ɸʷ], and [mʷ] before the back-close vowel /ɯ/.

=== Accent ===
Minica Huitoto has a mobile accent that falls on either the first or second syllable in a word with more than two syllables. This accent does not move when a suffix is added. The syllables of bisyllabic roots are either both accented, or the first is.

== Writing system ==
Minica Huitoto alphabet
a	b	c	ch	d	e	f	g	h	i	j	ll	m	n	ñ	ng	o	p	q	r	t	u	v	ɨ	z
