= Culture of Colombia =

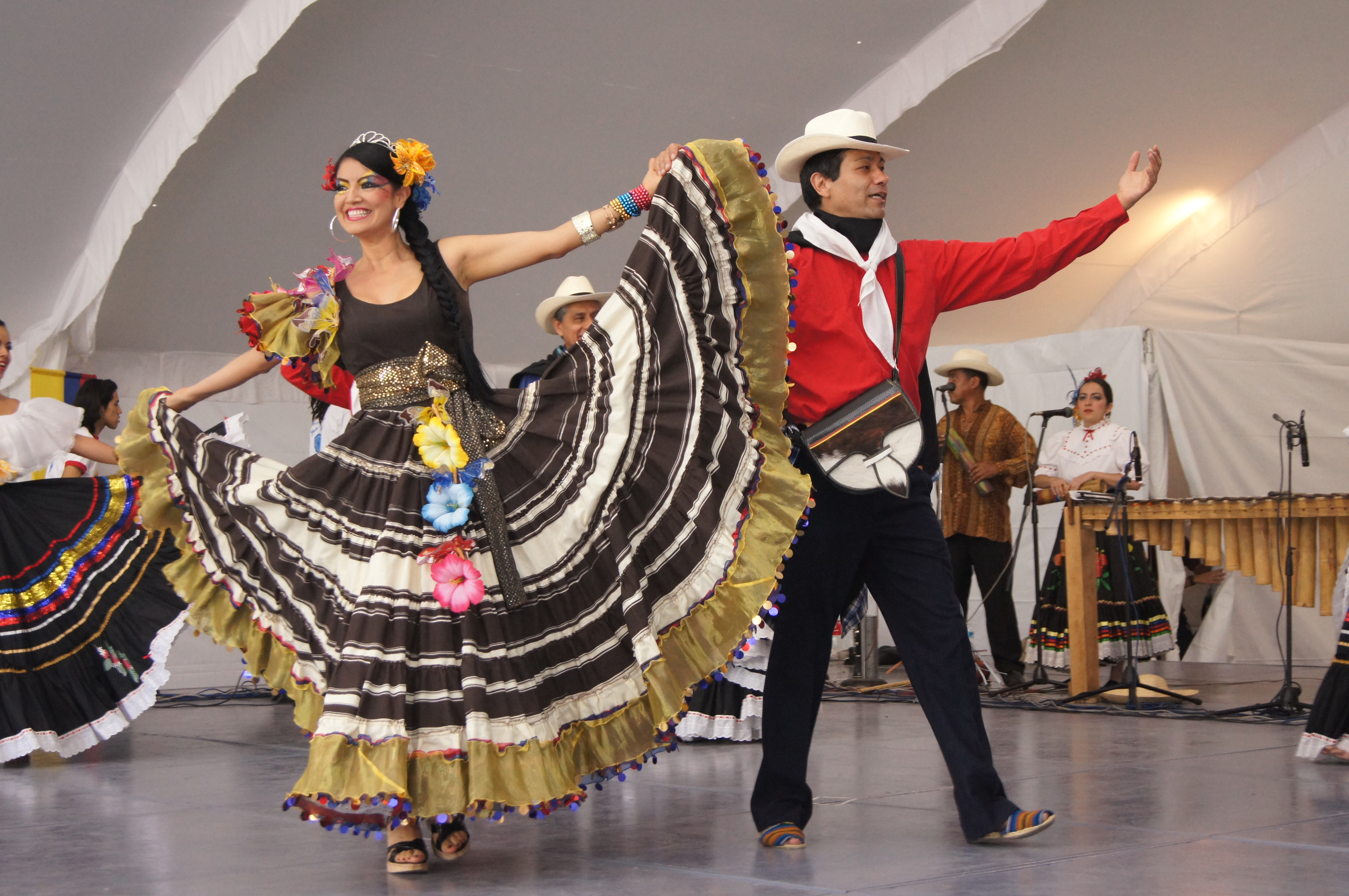
An example of folkloric dancing in Colombia

Many aspects of Colombian culture can be traced back to the early culture of Spain of the 16th century and its collision with Colombia's native civilizations (see: Muisca, Tayrona). The Spanish brought Catholicism, the feudal encomienda system, and a caste system that favored European descendants.

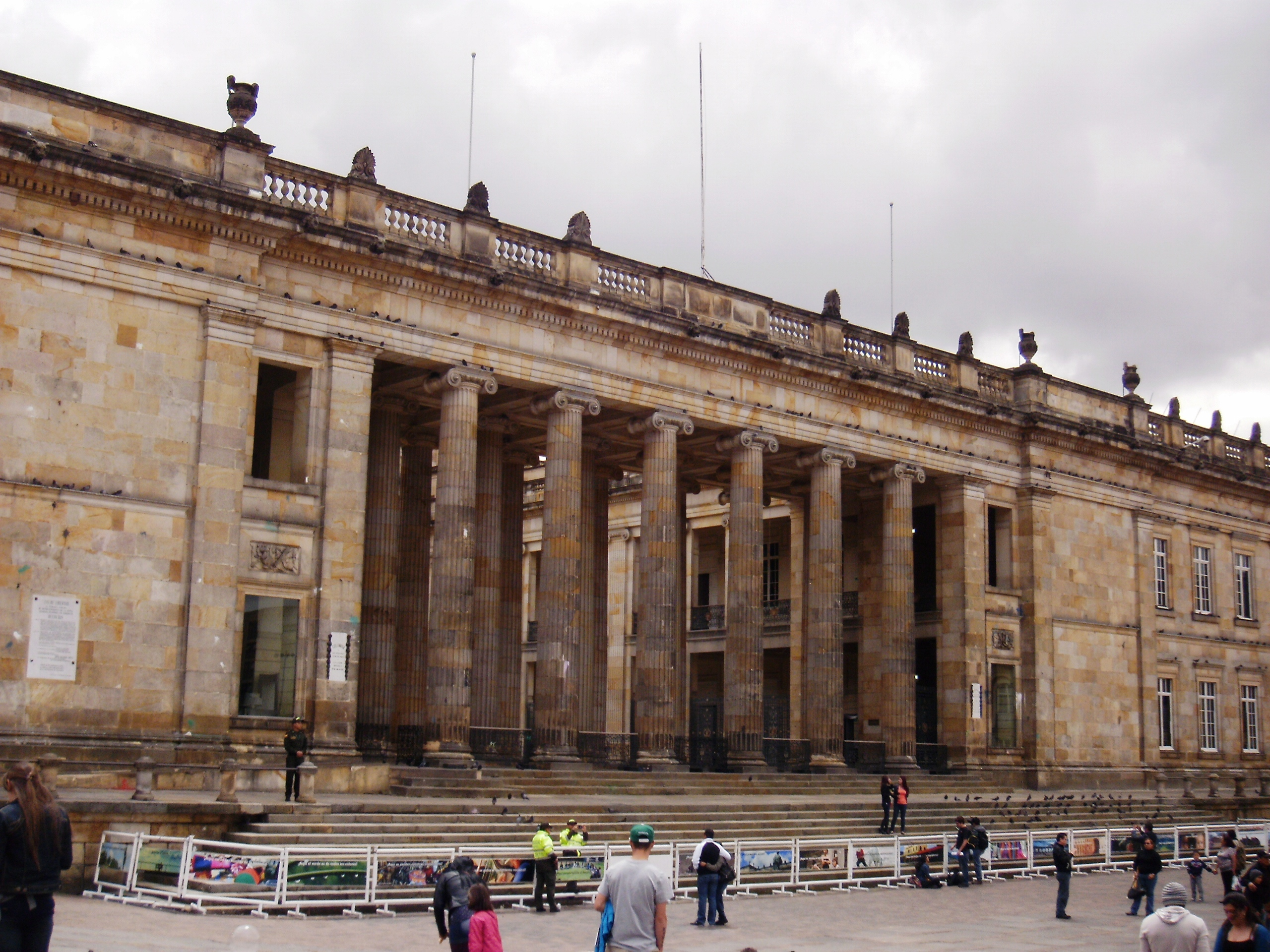
Capitolio Nacional on Plaza de Bolívar, Bogotá

After independence from Spain, the criollos struggled to establish a pluralistic political system, between conservative and liberal ideals. The conservatives supported the involvement of the Catholic Church in the state, while liberals favored the separation of these. The conservatives managed to outsource public education to the Catholic Church, and for many years, the church controlled the country's education system. Both parties engaged in multiple civil wars resulting in a slow development of the country and the isolation of regions until the end of the 19th century. Ethno-racial groups maintained their ancestral heritage culture: whites tried to keep themselves, despite the growing number of illegitimate children of mixed African or indigenous ancestry. These people were labeled with any number of descriptive names, derived from the casta system, such as mestizo, mulatto and moreno. Blacks and indigenous people of Colombia also mixed to form zambos, creating a new ethno-racial group in society. This mix also created a fusion of cultures. Carnivals for example became an opportunity for all classes and colors to congregate without prejudice. The introduction of the bill of rights of men and the abolishment of slavery (1851) eased the segregationist tensions between the races.

== Influences ==
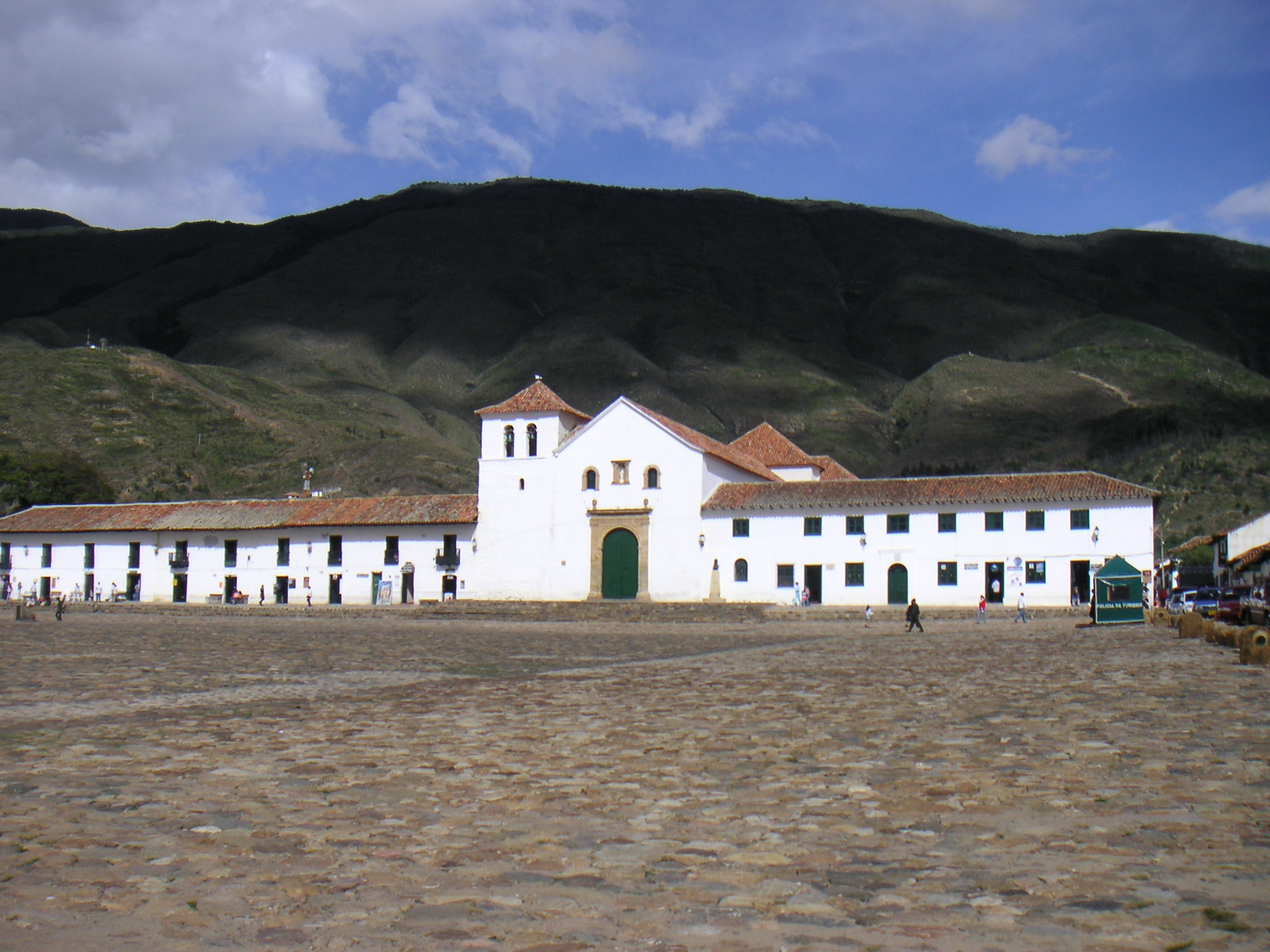
Villa de Leyva, a historical and cultural landmark of Colombia

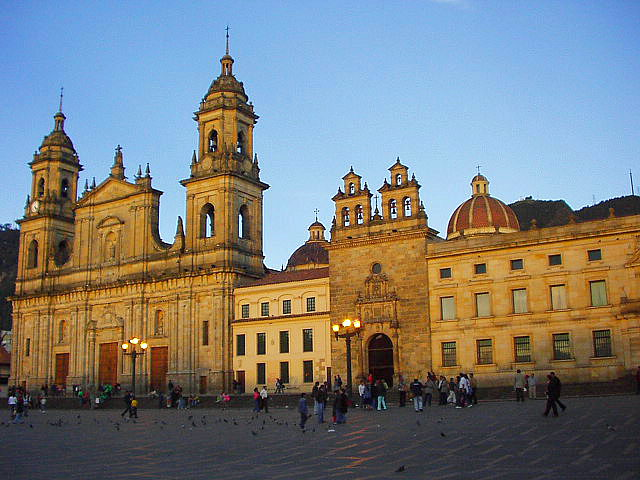
Cathedral in downtown Bogotá, heritage of Spanish architecture

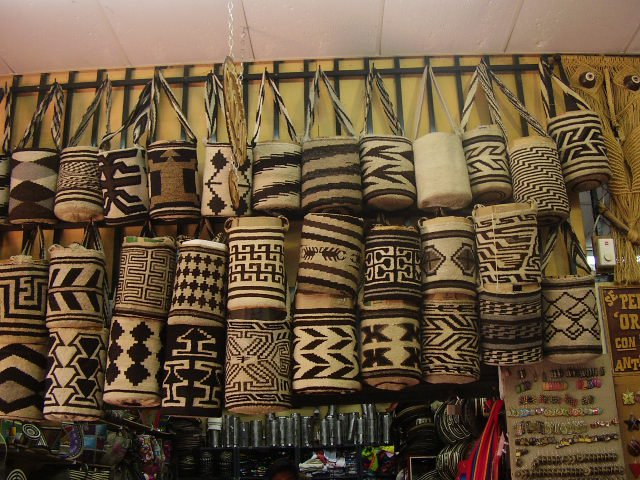
The arhuaca mochila is a popular Colombian artisan bag.

=== Geography and climate ===
The hydrography of Colombia is one of the richest in the world. Its main rivers are Magdalena, Cauca, Guaviare, and Caquetá. Colombia has four main drainage systems: the Pacific drain, the Caribbean drain, the Orinoco Basin and the Amazon Basin. The Orinoco and Amazon Rivers mark limits with Colombia to Venezuela and Peru respectively.

The striking variety in temperature and precipitation results principally from differences in elevation. Temperatures range from very hot at sea level to relatively cold at higher elevations but vary little with the season. Temperatures generally decrease about 3.5°F (2°C) for every 1,000-ft (300-m) increase in altitude above sea level, presenting perpetual snowy peaks to hot river valleys and basins. Rainfall is concentrated in two wet seasons (roughly corresponding to the spring and autumn of temperate latitudes) but varies considerably by location. Colombia's Pacific coast has one of the highest levels of rainfall in the world, with the south east often drenched by more than 200 in (500 cm) of rain per year. On the other hand, rainfall in parts of the Guajira Peninsula seldom exceeds 30 in (75 cm) per year. Rainfall in the rest of the country runs between these two extremes.

Colombians customarily describe their country in terms of the climatic zones. Below 900 meters (2,953 ft) in elevation is the tierra caliente (hot land), where temperatures vary between 24 and 38 °C (75.2 and 100.4 °F). The most productive land and the majority of the population can be found in the tierra templada (temperate land, between 900 and 1,980 meters (2,953 and 6,496 ft)), which provide the best conditions for the country's coffee growers, and the tierra fría (cold land, 1,980 and 3,500 meters (6,496 and 11,483 ft)), where wheat and potatoes dominate. In the tierra fría mean temperatures range between 10 and 19 °C (50.0 and 66.2 °F). Beyond the tierra fría lie the alpine conditions of the zona forestada (forested zone) and then the treeless grasslands of the páramos. Above 4,500 meters (14,764 ft), where temperatures are below freezing, is the tierra helada, a zone of permanent snow and ice.

About 86% of the country's total area lies in the tierra caliente. Included in this, and interrupting the temperate area of the Andean highlands, are the long and narrow extension of the Magdalena Valley and a small extension in the Cauca Valley. The tierra fría constitutes just 6% of the total area, but supports about a quarter of the country's population.

==== Natural regions ====
Natural regions of Colombia. Amazon Region Andean Region Caribbean Region Insular Region Orinoquía Region Pacific Region

Because of its natural structure, Colombia can be divided into six very distinct natural regions.

- Amazon Region: Comprises the part South of the eastern region of Colombia, flat low-lying region. It is the region of the Amazon jungle of Colombia.
- Andean Region: The Colombian part of the Andes, including the inter-Andean valleys of the rivers Cauca and Magdalena.
- Caribbean Region: The region of the Colombian Caribbean coastal plains and mountainous groups which do not belong to the Andes as the Sierra Nevada de Santa Marta.
- Insular Region: comprises the areas outside the continental territories of Colombia in the Caribbean region as the islands of San Andrés and Providencia and the islands of Gorgona and Malpelo in the Pacific Ocean.
- Orinoquía Region: North of the eastern region of Colombia that belongs to the Orinoco River watershed, flat low-lying region. Also known colloquially as the Eastern Plains.
- Pacific Region: It includes the coastal plains of the pacific coast and the mountainous groups which do not belong to the Andes, in particular the Serranía del Baudó.

=== Cultural influences ===
==== Indigenous influences ====
The culture of Colombia has vibrant indigenous influences within its culture. Indigenous peoples of Colombia are estimated to be around 4–10% of the country’s population, and most still hold on to indigenous traditions and folklore. Indigenous influences in Colombian culture include cuisine, music, architecture, language, folklore, clothing, etymology, and artisan crafts. The national hat of Colombia, the Sombrero Vueltiao, comes from the Zenú, and has been worn since pre-hispanic times. Food like the Arepa has been consumed in Colombia for around 3,000 years, and were made by the many indigenous peoples within the Colombian coast. Each Region of Colombia has their own indigenous culture that influenced the local culture, such as the Quechua in the Southwest, the Quimbaya in the Paisa Region, the Zenú and Tairona in the Caribbean, the Calima in Valle del Cauca, and the largest indigenous influence in Colombia, the Muisca in the Altiplano Cundiboyacense. Artisanship remains popular among indigenous peoples in Colombia to this day, one of the most popular being the Arhuaca mochila.

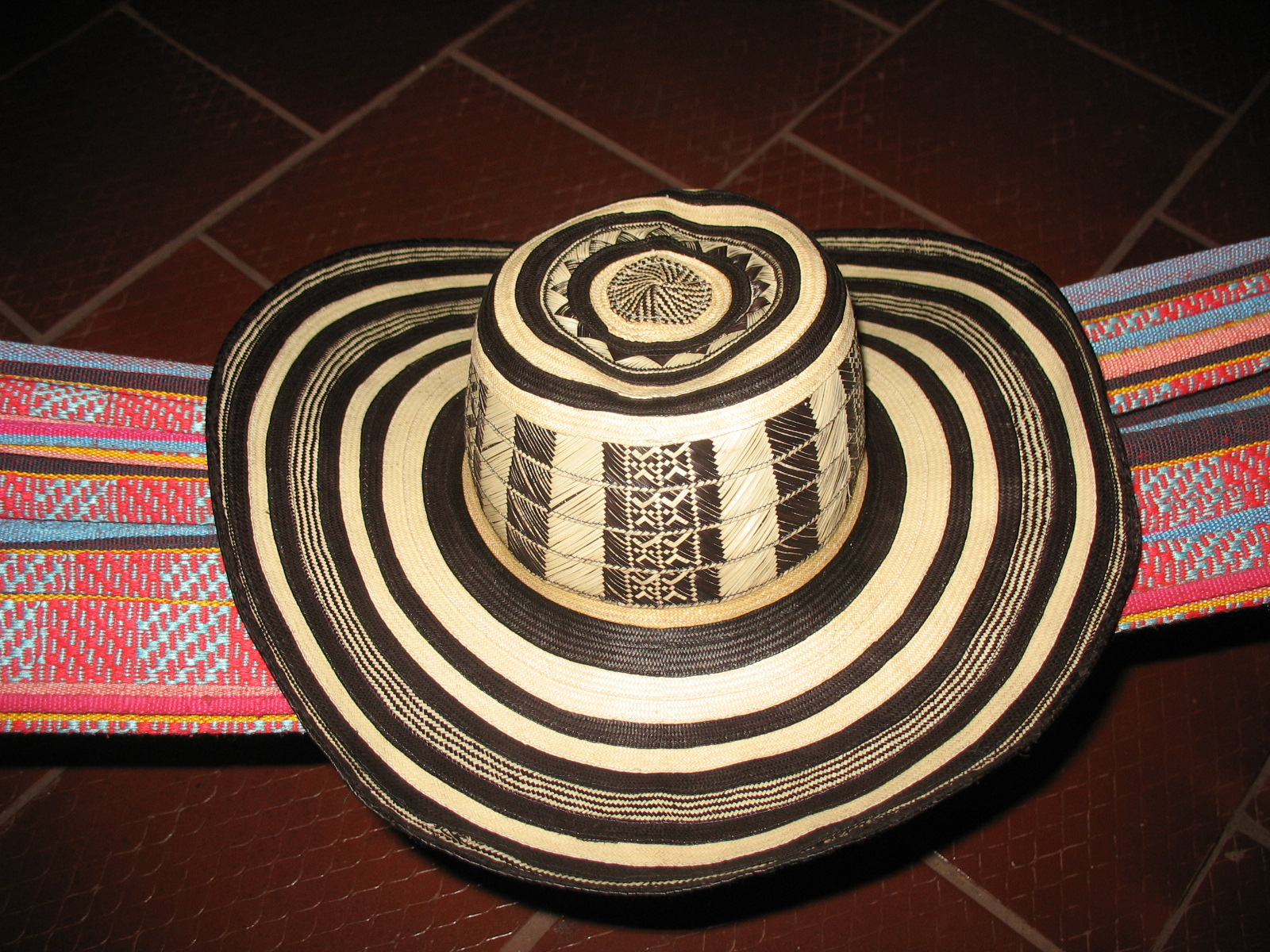
A sombrero vueltiao

==== Immigration and foreign influences ====
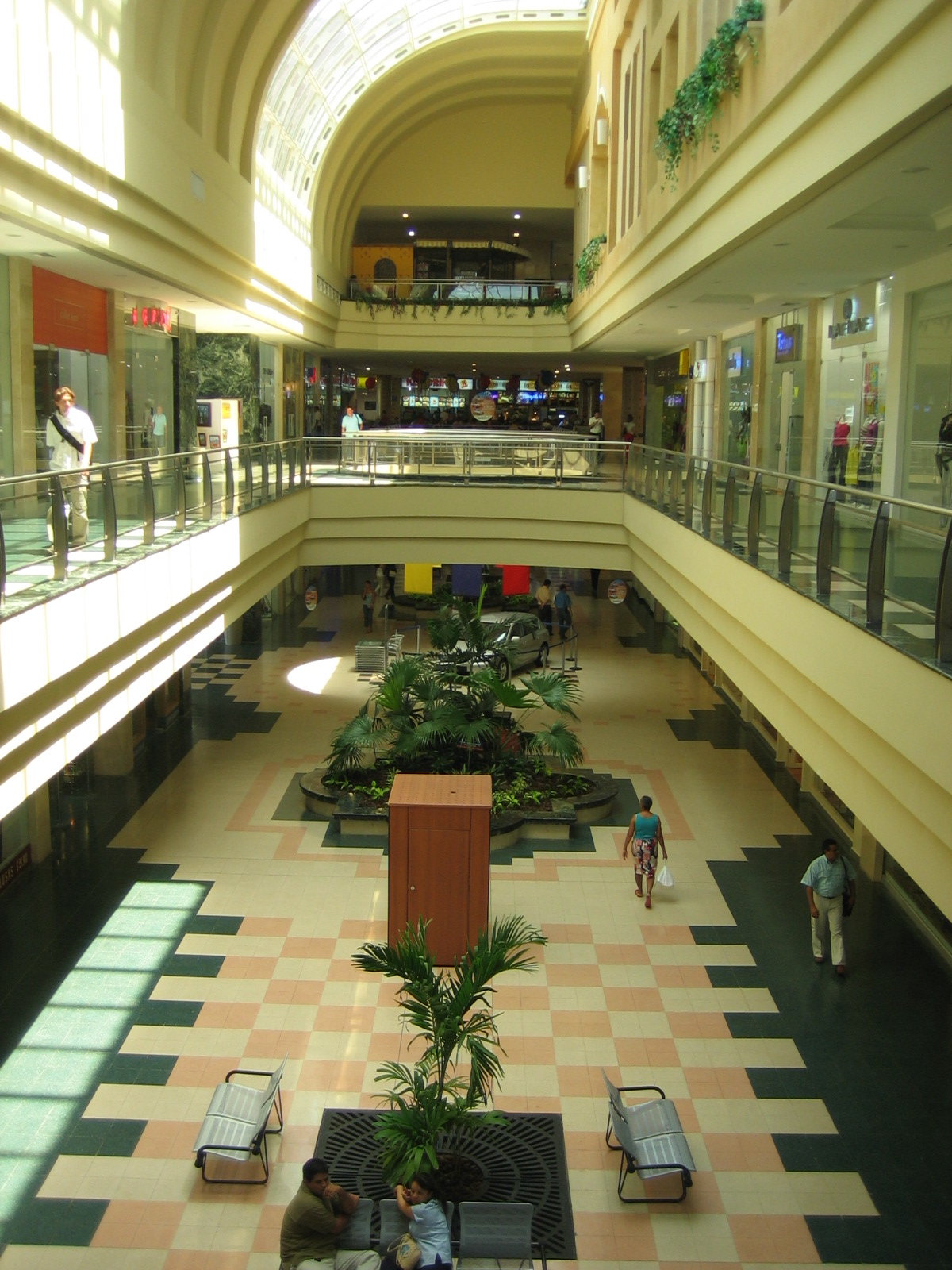
Shopping mall in Barranquilla

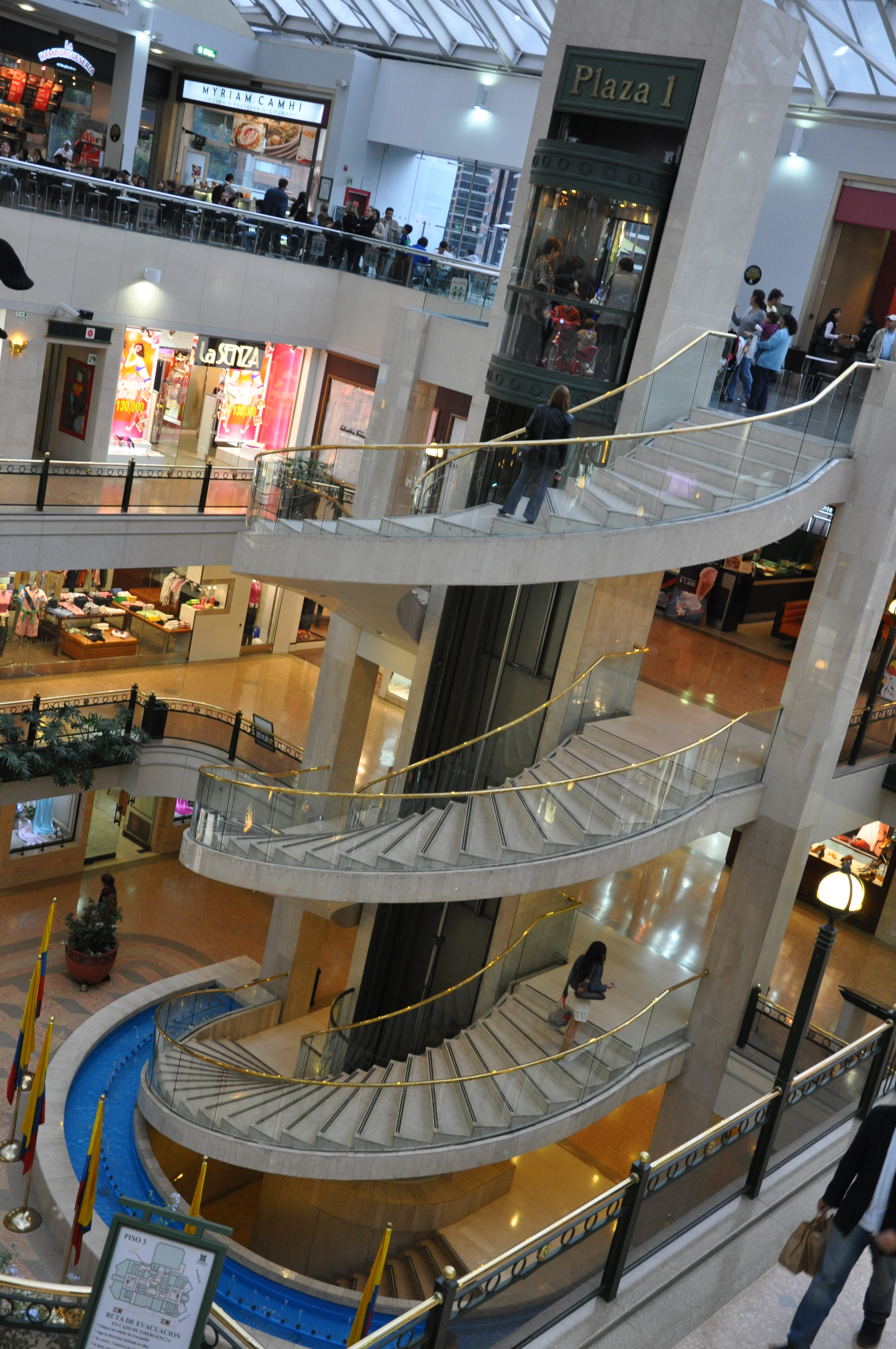
Modern mall in Bogotá

Colombia did not receive substantial immigration after the period of Spanish rule. Some exceptions are the capital city of Bogotá, the second largest city Medellín and the Atlantic port city of Barranquilla. Groups of French, Swiss, Dutch, Belgian, German, Italian, Lebanese and Syrian-Palestinian immigrants settled in the city and played a large role in its development. Shakira, a native of Barranquilla, is of partial Lebanese ancestry. Bogotá received some immigrants from Europe in the period following World War II; the eccentric former mayor of Bogotá and semiotics professor Antanas Mockus is the son of Lithuanian immigrants. Most Chinese in Colombia originally came from Panama, where they helped in the building of the railways of the Panama Canal, to help in building the train and road routes between the Pacific port of Buenaventura and the interior city of Cali. Today, in the surrounding area of the Cauca Valley, virtually every town has a Chinese restaurant.

A few Japanese families settled in Colombia, inspired by the bucolic description of the Cauca Valley in Jorge Isaacs' novel María. The heads-of-household of Japanese descent would be interred in prisons near Zipaquirá, during World War II.

Colombian politicians, intellectuals, and members of elite society turned to England and France for inspiration in the period, following independence from Spain. Colombian's civil code (adopted in 1887) is based on the Napoleonic Code. French architect Gastón Lelarge (1861–1934) designed many of the public edifices in Bogotá, as well as the cupola of the church of Saint Peter Claver in Cartagena.

Starting in the 20th century, North American culture had increasing influence on the culture of Colombia. Shopping malls and tract housing in the style of North American suburbs are very popular. Hollywood films, American fashions, and English-language popular music are also popular.

== Regional identities ==
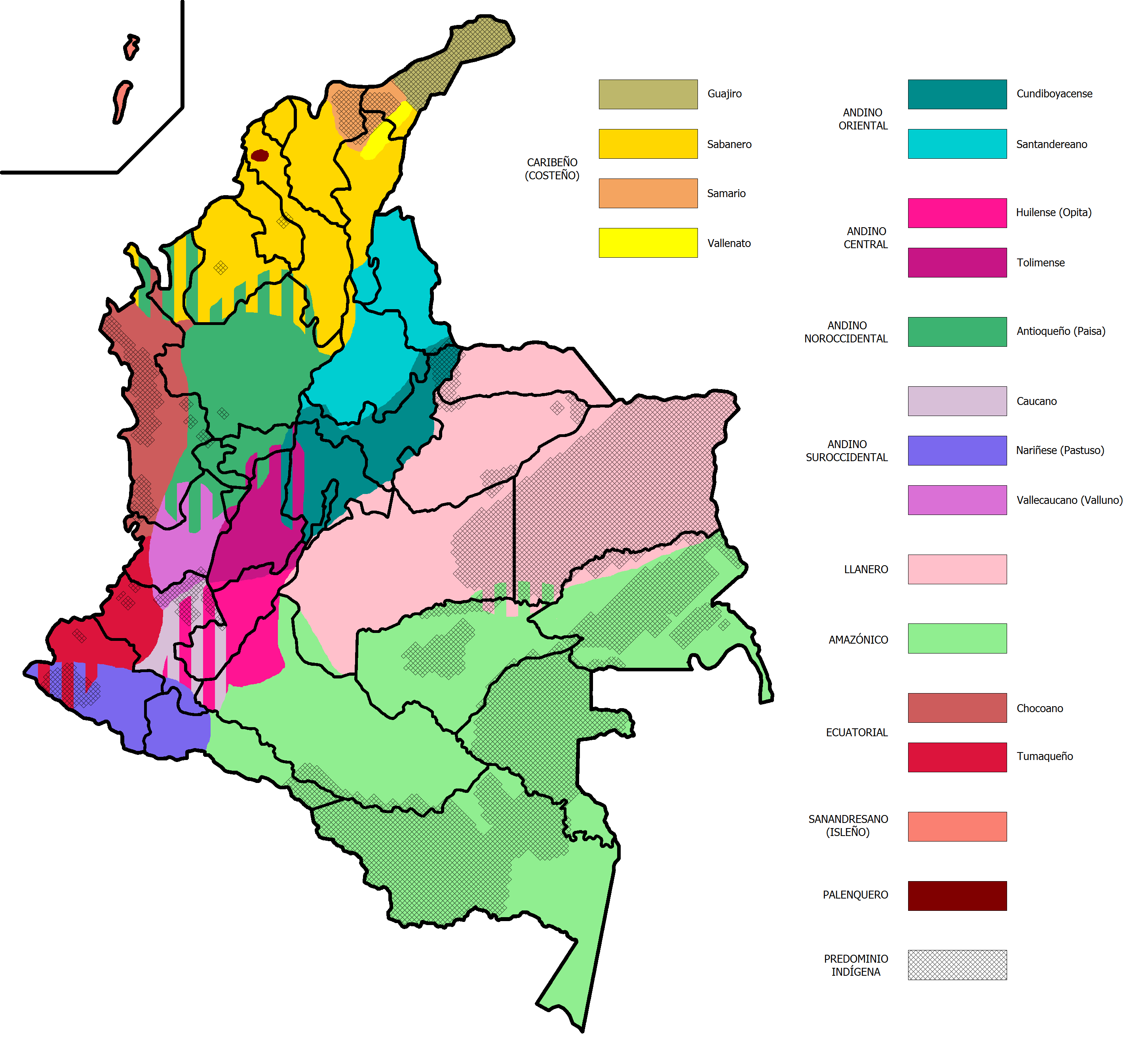
Dialects of Colombian Spanish

Due to existence of geographical and climatic barriers, regions in Colombia remained isolated for much of their history, boosting strong local identities. This is attributed to the fact that Colombia was not a unified nation during the Pre-Columbian Era and different regions had different indigenous civilizations inhabiting it, such as the Quimbaya in the Paisa region, the Muisca in the Altiplano Cundiboyacense, the Zenú and the Tairona in the Caribbean, the Pubenenses in Popayán, the Incas in Nariño, and the Calima in Valle del Cauca. These strong indigenous identities in each region led to the regions developing their own distinct dialects of Spanish influenced by the indigenous languages and distinct and unique cultures.

Despite the constitution of 1886 tried to establish an unified national identity around Spanish language and Catholic faith, Panama successfully seceded from Colombia in 1903. Even today, national consciousness remains low in much of the country.

During 20th century, government encouraged migration from inner regions to Amazon basin and San Andrés island, fostering a process of colombianization (see: Colombianization of Leticia, Putumayo and Caquetá).

However, separatism is a significant political force in San Andrés and Providencia, where raizals (Protestant Afro Caribbean group) are up one-third of population.

Other groups with a strong regional identities include:

- Paisas from Paisa region (Antioquia department and Coffee Axis), influenced by Basque and Quimbayan culture, they speak Paisa Spanish;
- Costeños from Caribbean region, influenced by African, Tairona, and Zenú culture and related to other Spanish speaking Caribbean nations, they speak Costeño Spanish;
- Pastusos from Southern Andean region, influenced by Inca culture and related to Ecuadorian Highlands, they speak Pastuso Spanish;
- Chocoanos from Pacific region, influenced mostly by African and Emberá culture, they speak Chocoano Spanish;
- Llaneros from Orinoquia region, influenced by the various indigenous groups and related to border populations from Venezuela, they speak Llanero Spanish.

== Education ==
The educational experience of many Colombian children begins with attendance at a preschool academy until age five (Educación preescolar). Basic education (Educación básica) is compulsory by law. It has two stages: Primary basic education (Educación básica primaria) which goes from first to fifth grade – children from six to ten years old, and Secondary basic education (Educación básica secundaria), which goes from sixth to ninth grade. Basic education is followed by Middle vocational education (Educación media vocacional) that comprises the tenth and eleventh grades. It may have different vocational training modalities or specialties (academic, technical, business, and so on.) according to the curriculum adopted by each school.

After the successful completion of all the basic and middle education years, a high-school diploma is awarded. The high-school graduate is known as a bachiller, because secondary basic school and middle education are traditionally considered together as a unit called bachillerato (sixth to eleventh grade). Students in their final year of middle education take the ICFES test (now renamed Saber 11) in order to gain access to higher education (Educación superior). This higher education includes undergraduate professional studies, technical, technological and intermediate professional education, and post-graduate studies.

Bachilleres (high-school graduates) may enter into a professional undergraduate career program offered by a university; these programs last up to five years (or less for technical, technological and intermediate professional education, and post-graduate studies), even as much to six to seven years for some careers, such as medicine. In Colombia, there is not an institution such as college; students go directly into a career program at a university or any other educational institution to obtain a professional, technical or technological title. Once graduated from the university, people are granted a (professional, technical or technological) diploma and licensed (if required) to practice the career they have chosen. For some professional career programs, students are required to take the Saber-Pro test, in their final year of undergraduate academic education.

Public spending on education as a proportion of gross domestic product in 2012 was 4.4%. This represented 15.8% of total government expenditure. In 2012, the primary and secondary gross enrolment ratios stood at 106.9% and 92.8% respectively. School-life expectancy was 13.2 years. A total of 93.6% of the population aged 15 and older were recorded as literate, including 98.2% of those aged 15–24.

== Family ==
The family is a highly important institution to Colombians as engraved by the traditional Roman Catholic church teachings. Members of the extended family are close and children rarely move far away from their parents. There is a deep sense of familial responsibility that stretches through many generations.

Traditionally, men were usually the head of the household, in charge of earning most of the family's income, while women were responsible for cooking, housework, and raising children. However, as in most cultures around the world, the dawn of the 20th century brought forth a great empowerment for women who were given a right to vote during the 1950s rule of dictator Gustavo Rojas Pinilla. The Constitution of 1991 gave a wider opportunity for women, and today, the majority of families (regardless of economic class) have two working parents due to the need of an income to sustain a family.

At a child's baptism, the parents of the child will choose godparents, padrinos. A child's padrinos will play an important role in their life, giving advice.

== Political attitudes ==
The Politics of Colombia take place in a framework of a presidential representative democratic republic, whereby the President of Colombia is both head of state and head of government, and of a multi-party system. Executive power is exercised by the government. Legislative power is vested in both the government and the two chambers of Congress, the Senate, and the House of Representatives of Colombia. The Judiciary is independent of the executive and the legislature.

== Food ==
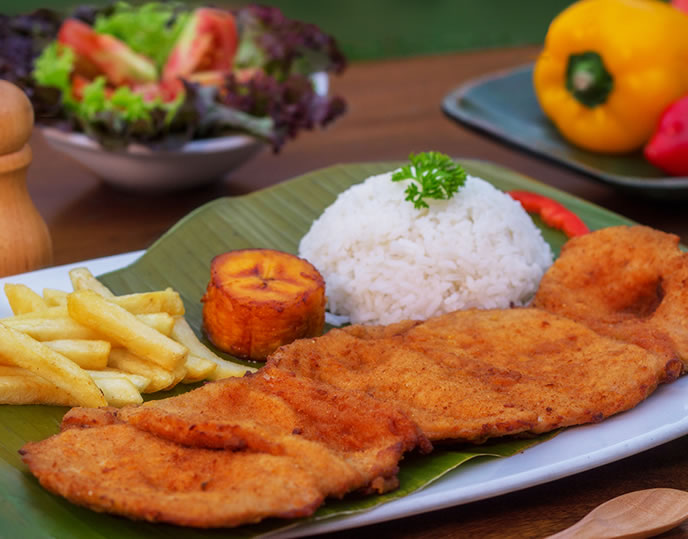
Cutlet "Valluna", a typical dish of the Valle del Cauca region of Colombia and the Afro-Colombian culture of the area near the Pacífic Ocean. It includes a milanesa, usually prepared with a lean pork loin beef or chicken can also be used. Traditional accompaniments include rice, sliced tomatoes, onions, chopped fried plantains or fries and a drink called "Lulada" made with lulo fruit, water and sugar

There is a large variety of dishes that take into account the difference in regional climates. For example:

- In the city of Medellín, the typical dish is the bandeja paisa. It includes beans, rice, ground meat or carne asada, chorizo, fried egg, arepa, and chicharrón. It is usually accompanied by avocado, tomato, and special sauces.
- In the city of Cali, the most traditional dish is "sancocho de gallina" – a soup composed mostly of chicken, plantain, corn, coriander, yuca root, and other seasonings.
- In Bogotá and the Andean region, ajiaco is the traditional dish. It is also a type of soup made of chicken, potatoes, and flavoured with a locally grown herb called "guasca". Traditionally, cream and capers are added just before eating. Both soups are served with white rice, salads with a hint of lemon, avocado, or plantain chips, sweet or salty. For breakfast people often eat changua, a milk, scallion, and egg soup.
- In the Caribbean coast, seafood is popular, including fish and lobster. Coconut rice is a common dish along the coastal cities, as are patacones, or fried plantain patties.
- In the Llanos, meat from the barbecue, such as the "ternera llanera" is common, and also typical river fishes like the "amarillo".
- In the Amazonas, the cuisine is influenced by Brazilian and Peruvian traditions.

Inland, the dishes reflect the mix of cultures, inherited mainly from Amerindian and European cuisine, and the produce of the land mainly agriculture, cattle, river fishing, and other animals' raising. Such is the case of the sancocho soup in Valledupar, the arepas (a corn based bread-like patty). Local species of animals like the guartinaja, part of the wayuu Amerindian culture.

- In the Tolima region, the Tamales Tolimenses are a delicacy. These tamales are made of a corn dough and feature peas, carrots, potatoes, rice, chicken, pork, and various spices. They are wrapped in plantain leaves and boiled for three to four hours. It also typical to have Pandebono for breakfast, with hot chocolate.
- On the Islands of San Andres, Providencia, and Santa Catalina, the main dish is rondon, a seafood dish made of coconut milk, fish, conch, cassava root (yuca), sweet potato, white yams, and pumpkin seasoned with chili peppers and herbs. They also have a crab soup which is considered a delicacy. It is made with the same ingredients as rondon, without the fish.
- Ají picante, a spicy, cilantro-based sauce, is used as a condiment for many dishes and sides, including empanadas, patacones, and soups. This traditional sauce is from the city of Antioquia.

== Festivals in Colombia ==
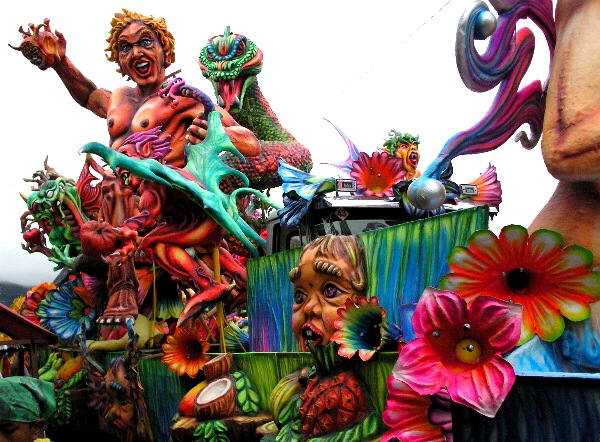
Blacks and Whites' Carnival

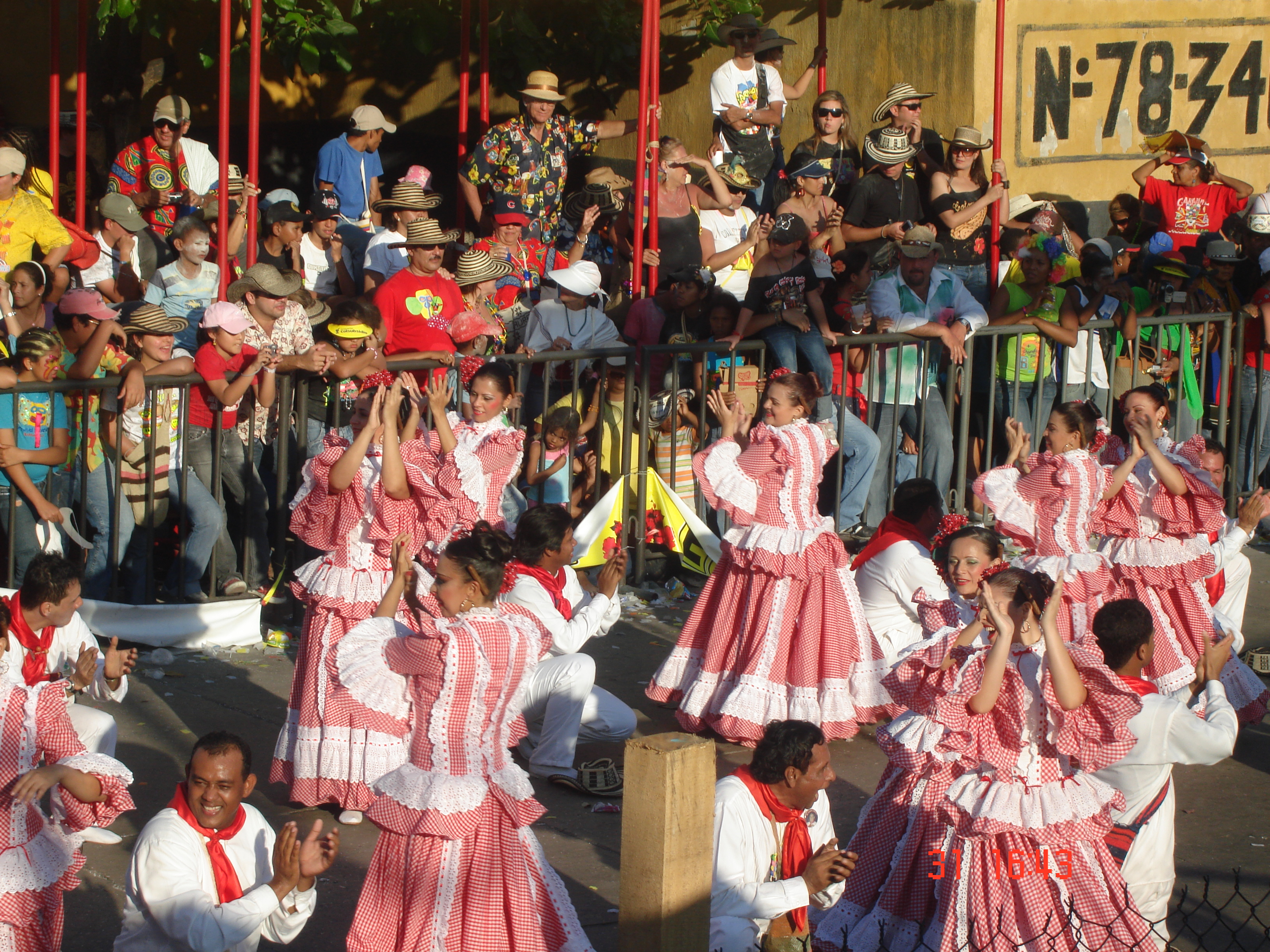
Barranquilla's Carnival

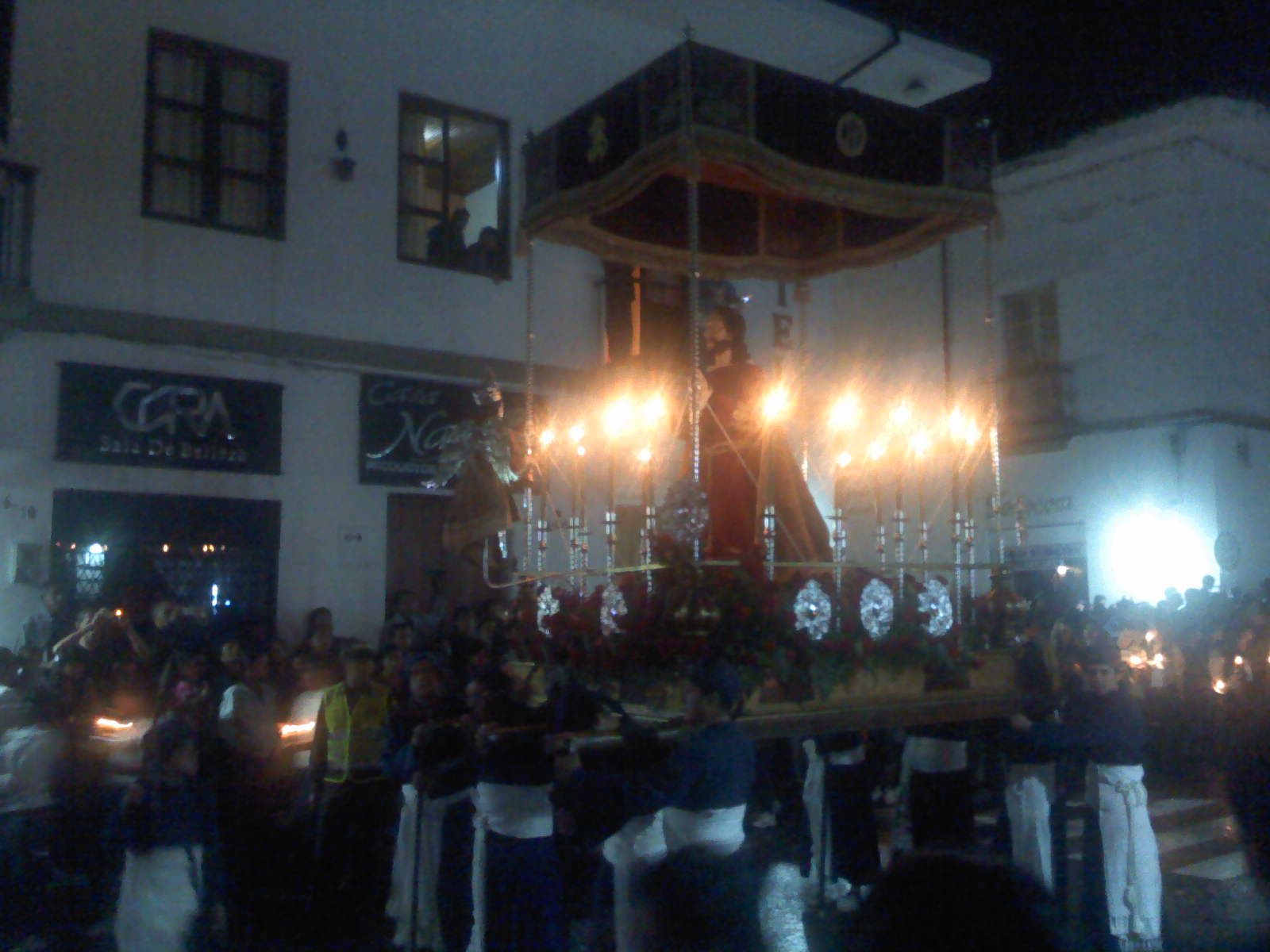
Holy Week in Popayán

== Folklore ==
Colombia has many traditional folk tales and stories about legendary creatures, which are transmitted orally and kept for next generations to come. Some of them are common with other Latin American countries. The Colombian folklore has strong influences from Spanish culture, with elements of Native American and African cultures.

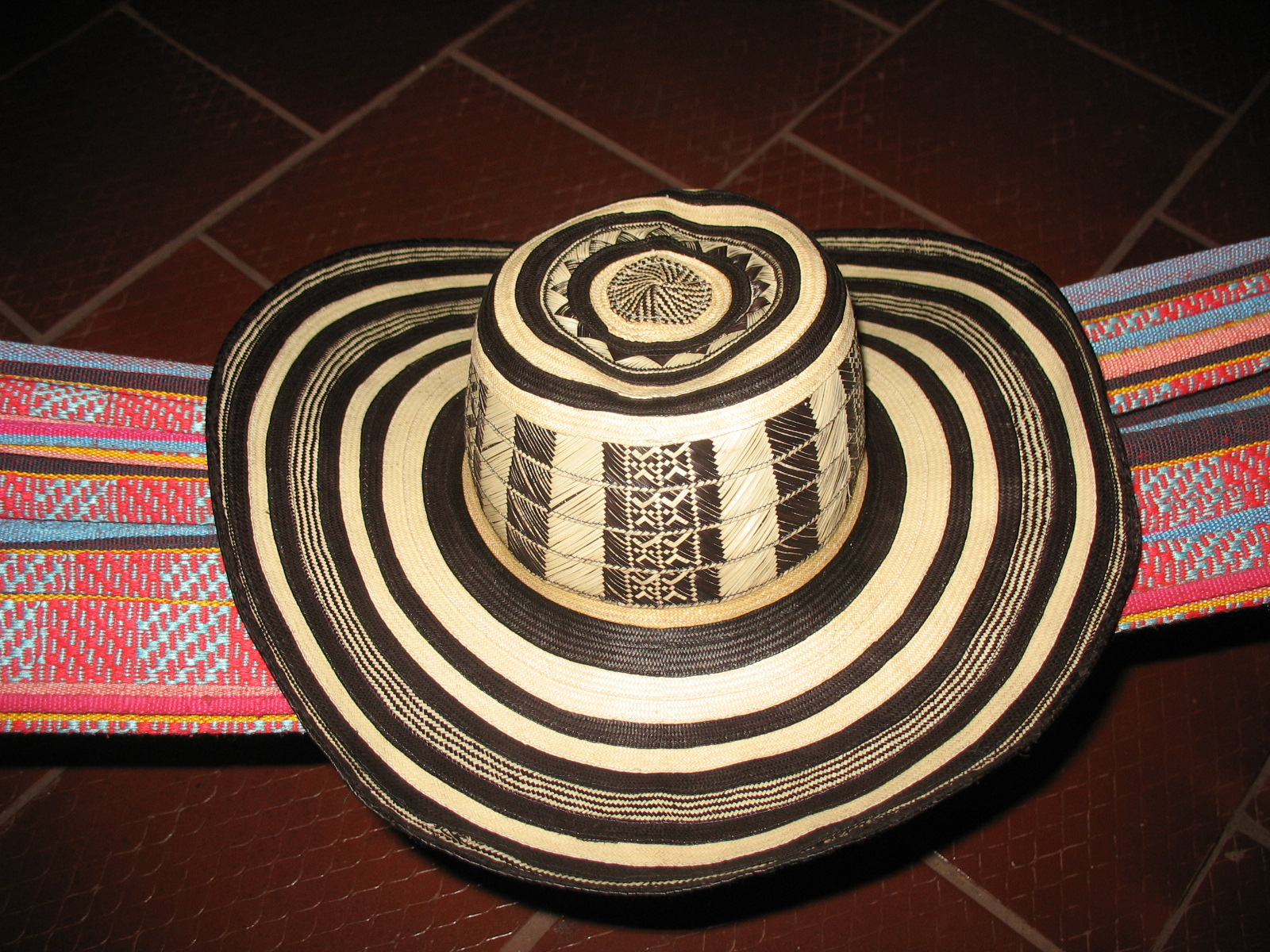
The vueltiao hat, a handicraft of the Zenú people, is a national symbol.

== Painting ==
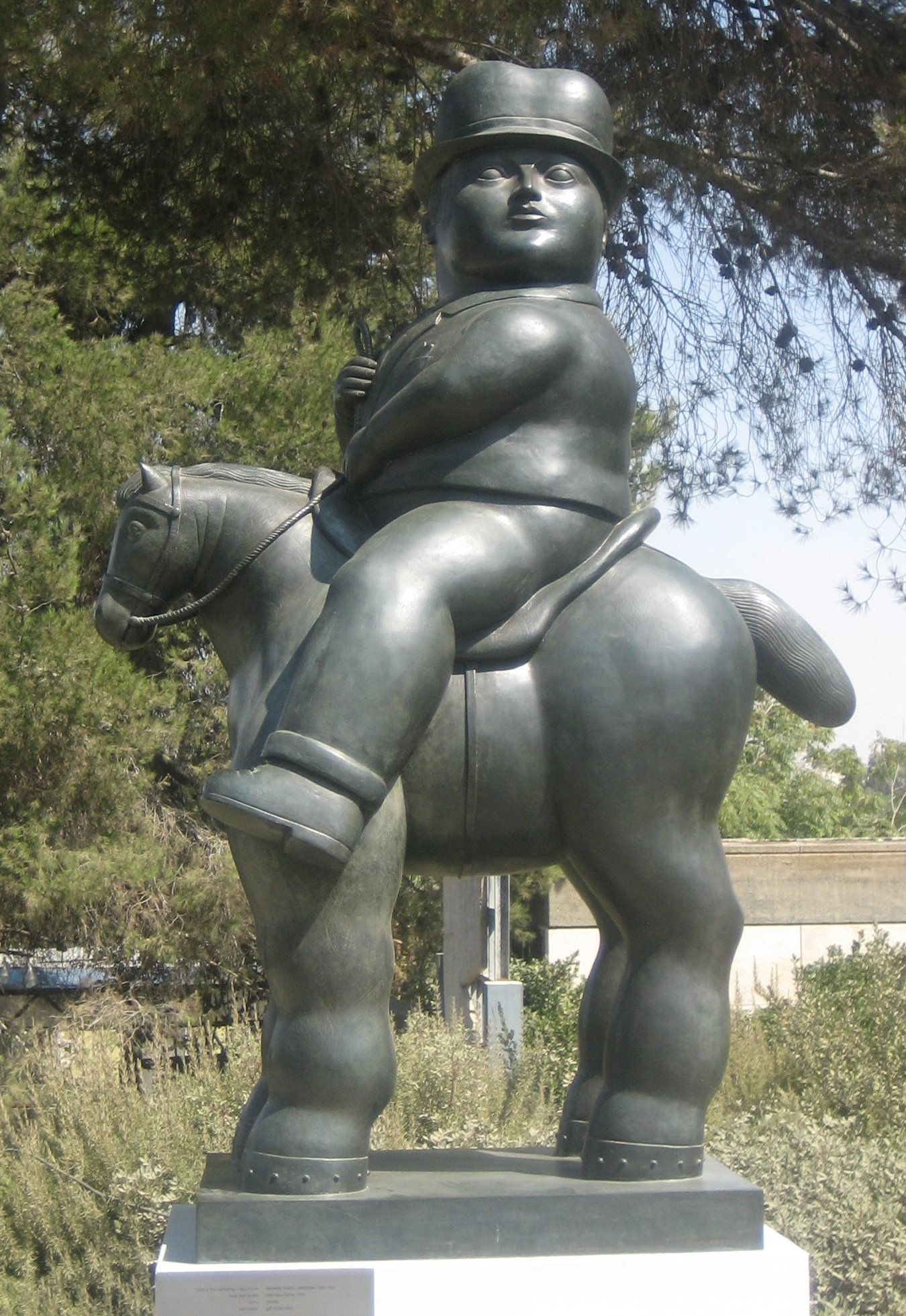
A sculpture by Colombian painter and sculptor Fernando Botero in Jerusalem

Colombians have been producing art for thousands of years. Ornate golden figures, and jewelry from millennia ago have been discovered by both ruthless conquistadors and careful archaeological digs.

In the colonial time, the painting was characterized by the works of the three Figueroa, pioneers of this art: Baltasar de Figueroa the Elder; Gaspar de Figueroa, his son, and Baltasar Vargas de Figueroa. Gaspar was the teacher of important artists, like Gregorio Vásquez de Arce y Ceballos. José María Espinoza Prieto, painter and engraver, also is important for his portraits, landscapes and caricatures. Epifanio Garay is highlighted, especially by his portraits.

After the war of independence, in 1819, the Colombian art still was dependent of the figurative. Some people explain that delay in the evolution of the Colombian artistic style is due to the geography of the country, that make difficult a contact and dialogue between the different creative tendencies

In the decades between 1920 and 1940, Marco Tobón Mejía, José Horacio Betancur, Pedro Nel Gómez, Ignacio Gómez Jaramillo, Santiago Martínez Delgado, and Alipio Jaramillo created some dynamics in the elaboration of murals. They were influenced by the Mexican art, although with neoclassic and Art Nouveau characteristics. At the beginning of the 1940 decade, are created works that was new in Colombia, inspired in the post-impressionism and the academic French style.

Many historians of art believe that the Colombian art only began to have a distinctive character in the second half of the 20th century, with a new point of view, integrating the cultural and artistic traditional elements, with the concepts of the art in the 20th century. Ignacio Gómez Jaramillo, for example, combine the new techniques with cultural elements, in his Portrait to the Greiff Brothers. Pedro Nel Gómez, highlighted in the drawing, the water color, the fresco, the oil painting, and the sculpture in wood, stone, and bronze, shows, for example in "Autorretrato con sombrero" (1941), his familiarity with the works of Gauguin and Van Gogh. In other works, he reveal the influence of Cézanne. Alejandro Obregon, considered by many as the father of the Colombian art (most by his originality), has been acclaimed by critics and the public, because of his painting of national landscapes characterized by violent strokes and the symbolic and expressionist use of animals (specially birds, like the condor). His work is influenced by Picasso and Graham Sutherland.

In last years, some Colombian artists, such as Fernando Botero, Enrique Grau, David Manzur, Luis Caballero, Santiago Martinez Delgado, Ignacio Gomez Jaramillo, Débora Arango, Kajuma and have received international fame, awards and wide public acclaim.

== Religion ==
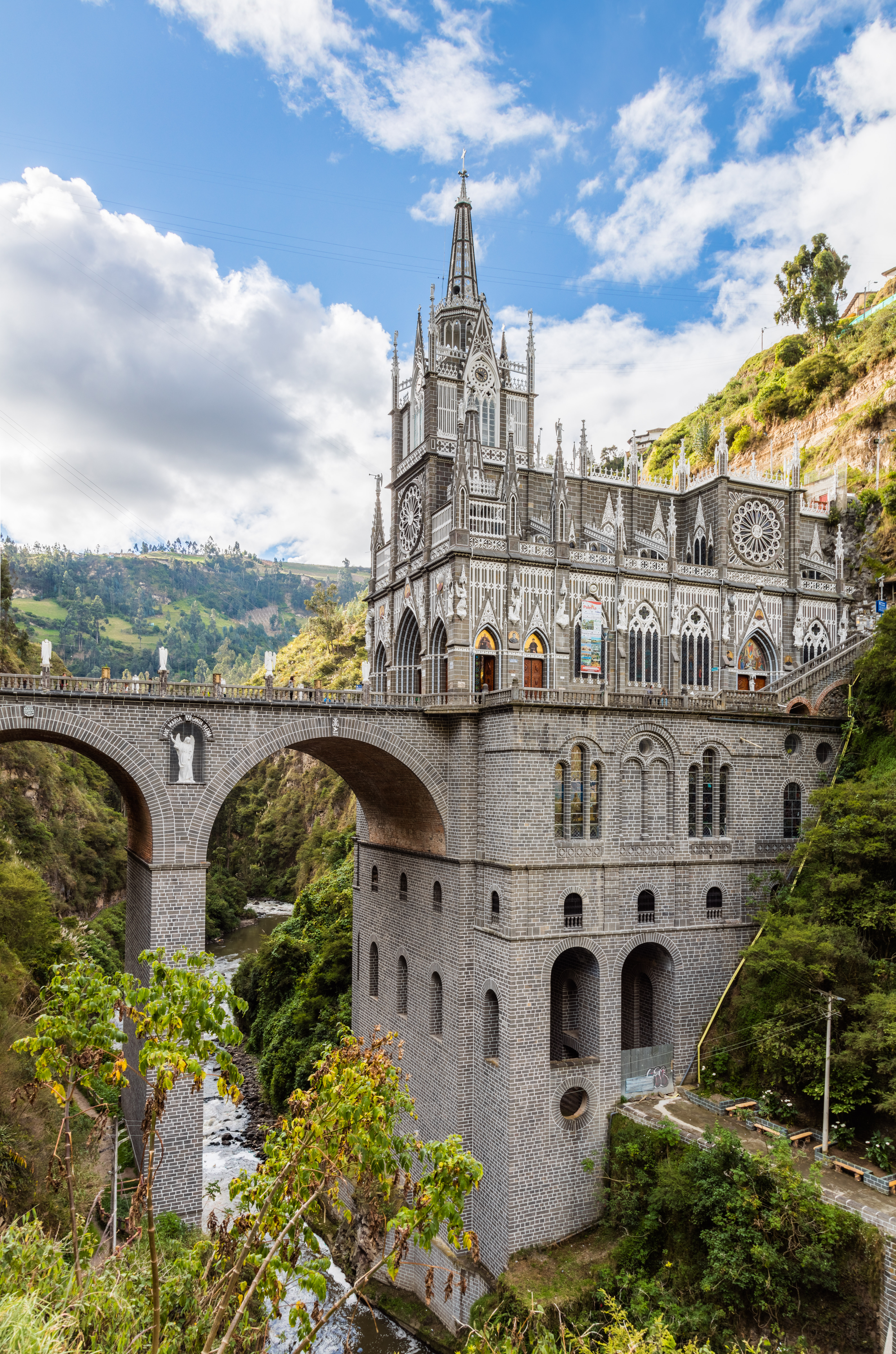
Las Lajas Cathedral in Nariño

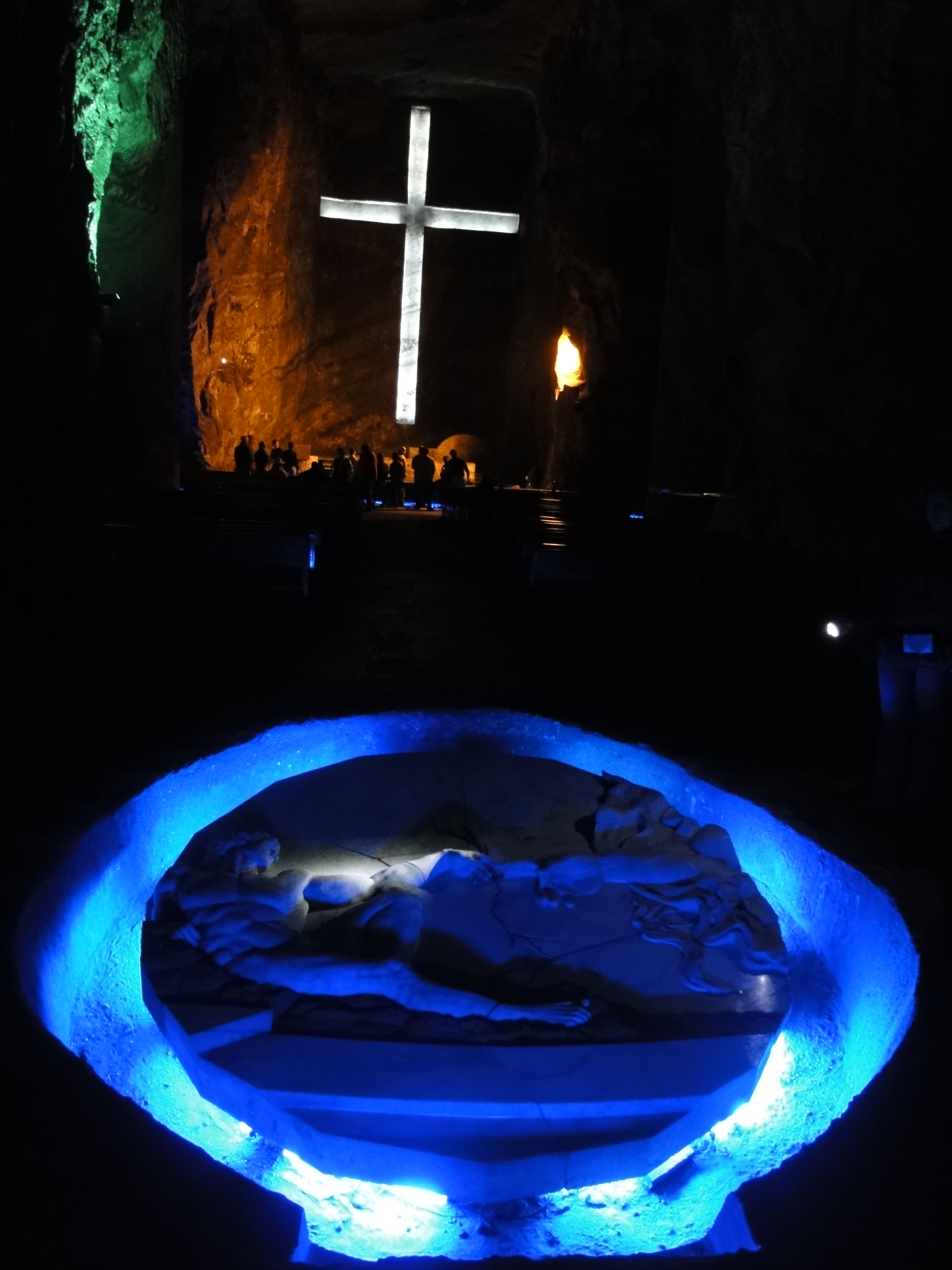
Sculpture of the creation of man in the central nave of the Salt Cathedral of Zipaquirá

Studies suggest that about 70.9% of Colombians are Roman Catholic. However, Colombians are notable for their acceptance of other creeds and faith.

The National Administrative Department of Statistics (DANE) does not collect religious statistics, and accurate reports are difficult to obtain. However, based on various studies and a survey, about 90% of the population adheres to Christianity, the majority of which (70.9%) are Roman Catholic, while a significant minority (16.7%) adhere to Protestantism (primarily Evangelicalism). Some 4.7% of the population is atheist or agnostic, while 3.5% claim to believe in God but do not follow a specific religion. 1.8% of Colombians adhere to Jehovah's Witnesses and Adventism and less than 1% adhere to other religions, such as Islam, Judaism, Buddhism, Mormonism, Hinduism, Indigenous religions, Hare Krishna movement, Rastafari movement, Eastern Orthodox Church, and spiritual studies. The remaining people either did not respond or replied that they did not know. In addition to the above statistics, 35.9% of Colombians reported that they did not practice their faith actively.

While Colombia remains a mostly Roman Catholic country by baptism numbers, the 1991 Colombian constitution guarantees freedom of religion and all religious faiths and churches are equally free before the law.

== Literature ==
Gabriel García Márquez, winner of the Nobel Prize for Literature in 1982, is from Aracataca, Colombia. His novel One Hundred Years of Solitude is recognized as a landmark of the literary movement known as "magical realism (realismo mágico)".

Other important writers are Álvaro Mutis, winner of the Cervantes Prize, Jorge Isaacs, who wrote "María", Gonzalo Arango, founder of the Nadaismo movement, Fernando Vallejo, winner of the Rómulo Gallegos prize, José Asunción Silva, precursor of Latin American romanticism, Raúl Gómez Jattin, Efraím Medina, Andrés Caicedo, the poets Piedad Bonnet and María Mercedes Carranza, Aurelio Arturo, the novelist Germán Espinosa, Augusto Pinilla, and Rafael Chaparro Madiedo. The most important literary magazines are El Malpensante, Arcadia, Número, La Movida Literaria, Universidad de Antioquia, and Puesto de Combate.

== Colombian theatre ==
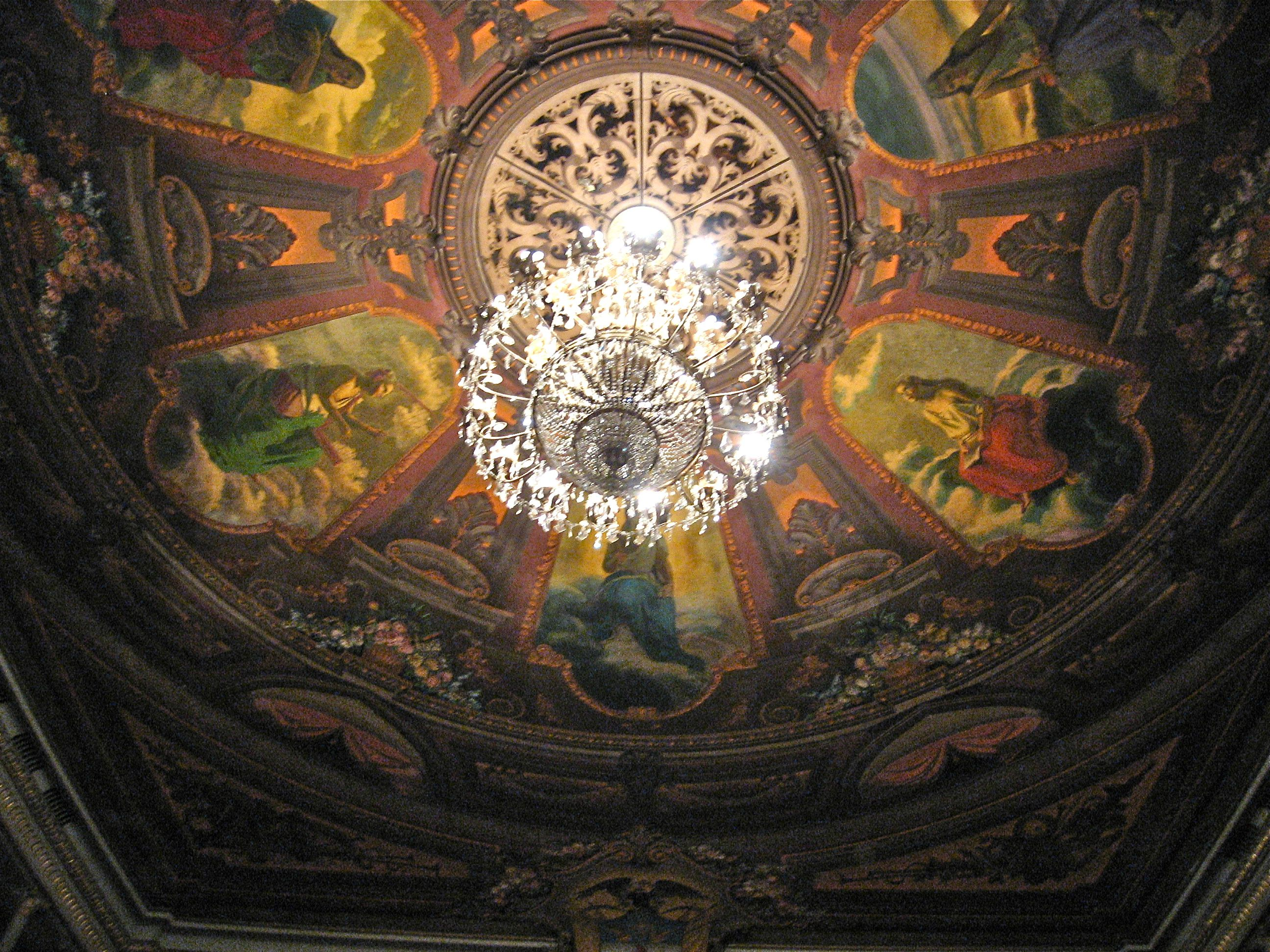
The Teatro de Cristóbal Colón (The Christopher Columbus Theatre), also known as the "Teatro Colón", is located in Bogotá, Colombia and it is the nation's National Theatre.

- Cali Festival Theater
- Cali Performance Festival
- Carnavalada - Theater to the Streets - Open Air Theater Festival of Barranquilla
- Colombian Theater Festival of Medellín - Medellín en Escena
- Festival de teatro Gitanos en Macondo - first week of September in Aracataca, Madalena.
- Iberoamerican Theater Festival of Bogotá
- International Theater Festival and Storytellers Encounter of Popayan
- International Theater Festival of Barrancabermeja - Theater for the Peace
- International Theater Festival of Manizales

== Film and television ==
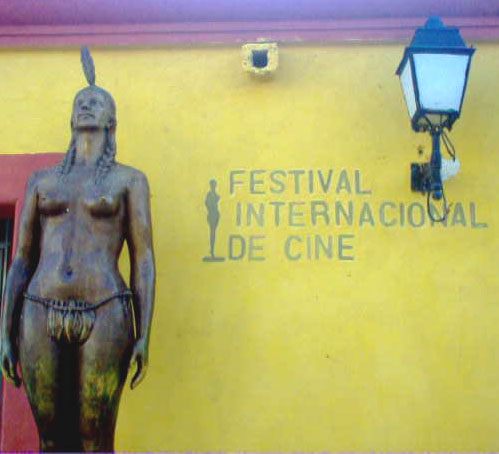
The Cartagena Film Festival is the oldest cinema event in Latin America. The central focus is on films from Ibero-America.

The interest for the film production came late to Colombia. Vicenzo and Francesco Di Doménico, of Italian origin, were the pioneers in the films production. In 1912, it is inaugurated the first movie theater in Colombia: the Salón Olympia, with a capacity of three thousand people. The most outstanding directors of the film production are Sergio Cabrera, Felipe Aljure, Luis Ospina, Víctor Gaviria, and Carlos Mayolo. Between the most recent proposals, we find to Andy Baíz and Juan Felipe Orozco, director of "Al final del espectro". The work of Dago García and Rodrigo Triana is in a commercial line.

== Sports ==
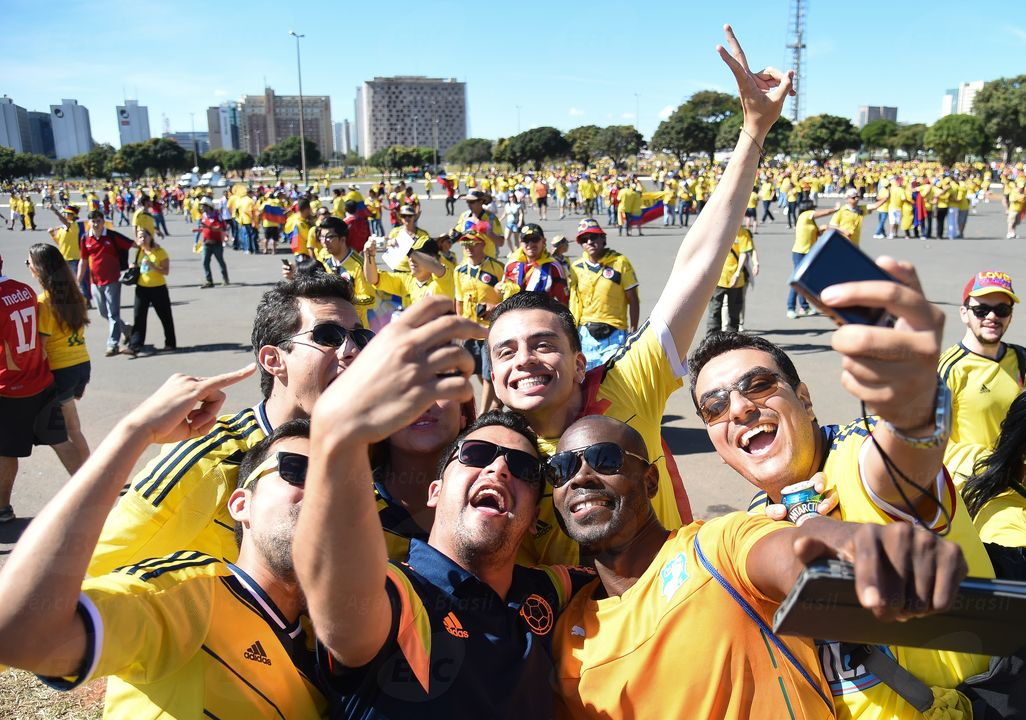
Colombian fans at the 2014 FIFA World Cup

Soccer, or association football (Spanish: fútbol), is the most popular sport in Colombia. Soccer games are popular social events in Colombia. Baseball has become popular in recent years; it is especially popular along the coast, and is strongly promoted all around the country. Édgar Rentería is an example of a famous Colombian baseball player, but football is still the main sport in the country. Boxing and martial arts are also very popular amongst the male population, and all of these are practiced avidly by the youth.

An ancient game called Tejo, inherited from the Muisca, is also played. The object of tejo is to throw a small metal disk at a gunpowder detonator in a small circular area. The winner is calculated by the number of explosions compared to number of throws.

== Comedy ==
Colombian comedy's original birthplace is the radio, since this was the first original mass media with wide coverage of the national territory rendering radio a very important medium for the promotion of comedy. A distinctive representative of Colombian comedy on the radio and who was praised by generations, even before television became popular was Colombian comedian Gullermo Zuluaga, better known by his stage name Montecristo. Since then, many other comedians and storytellers have shaped Colombian's concept of what is humorous in many cases at the expense of the tragedies of war, economic distress, and misbehaved politicians.

== Music ==
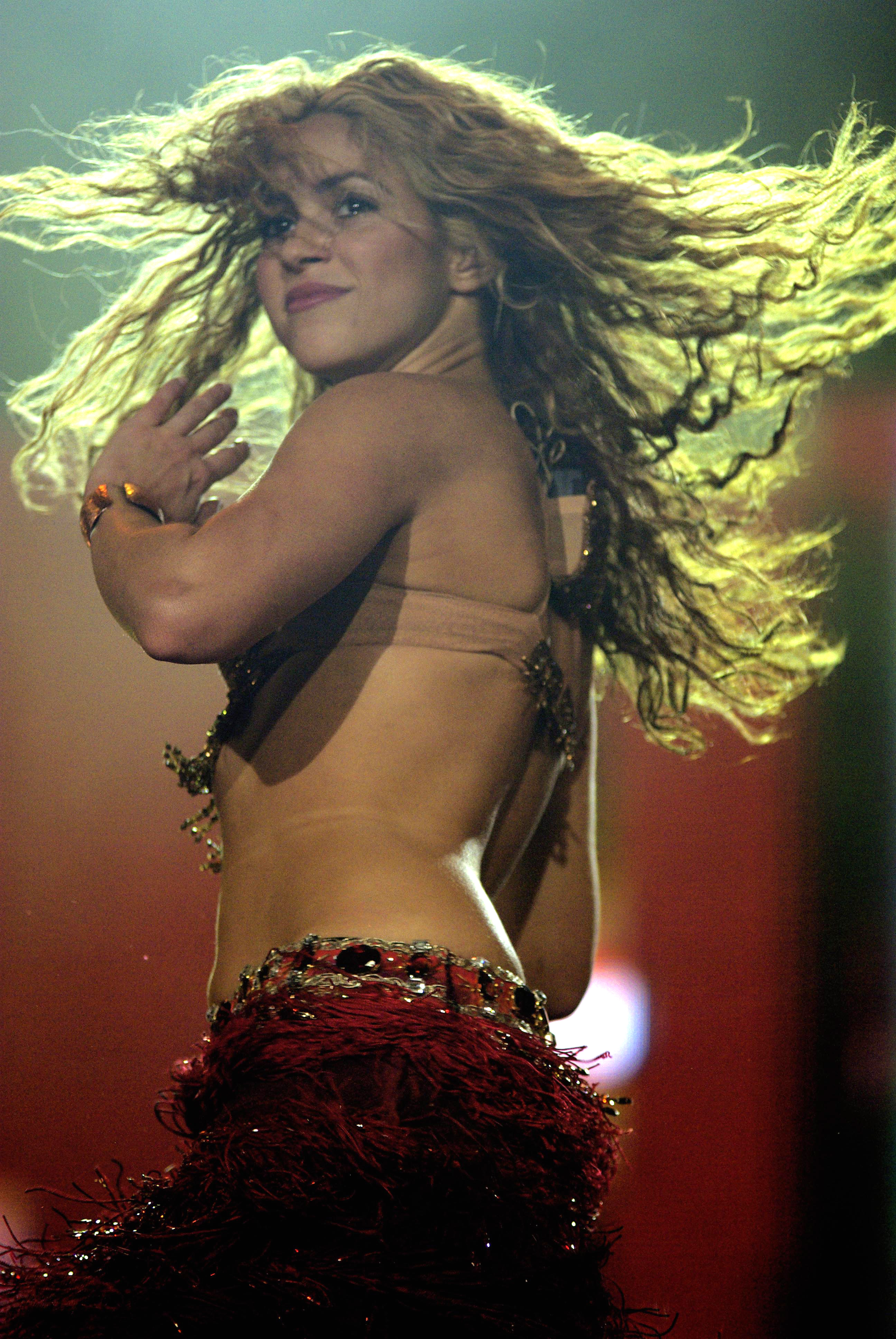
Shakira, Colombian singer

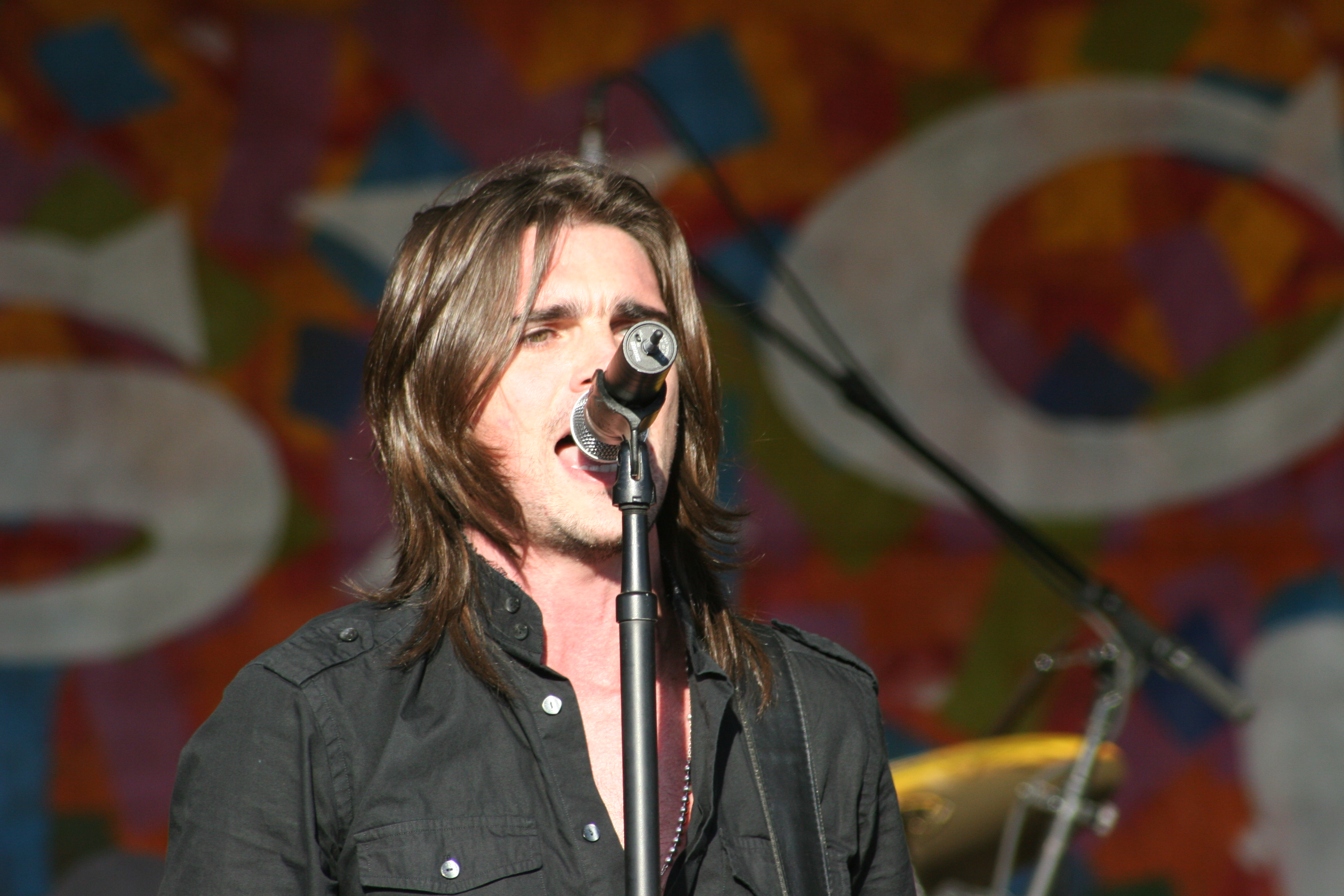
Juanes, artist from Medellín

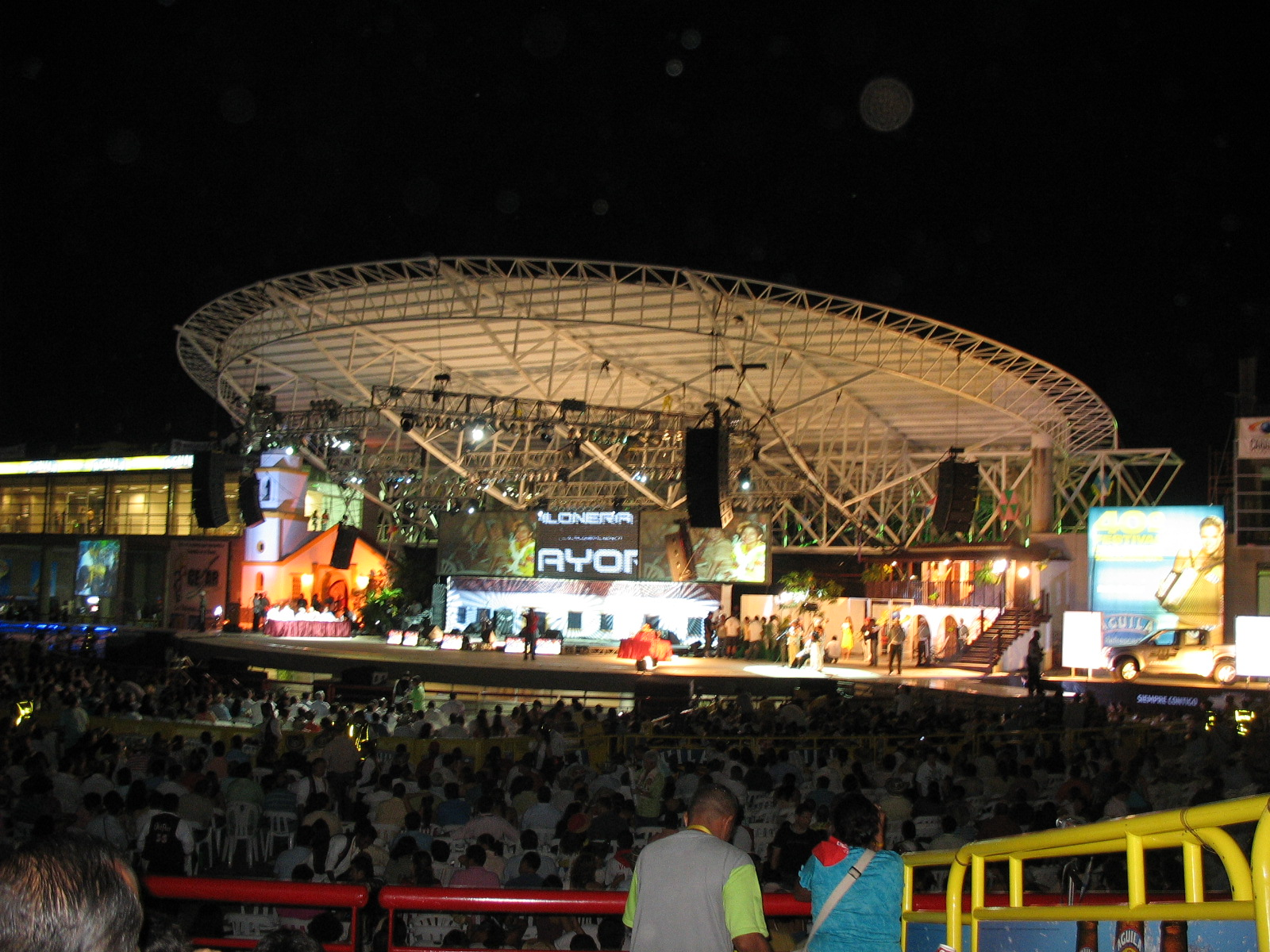
Vallenato Festival in Valledupar

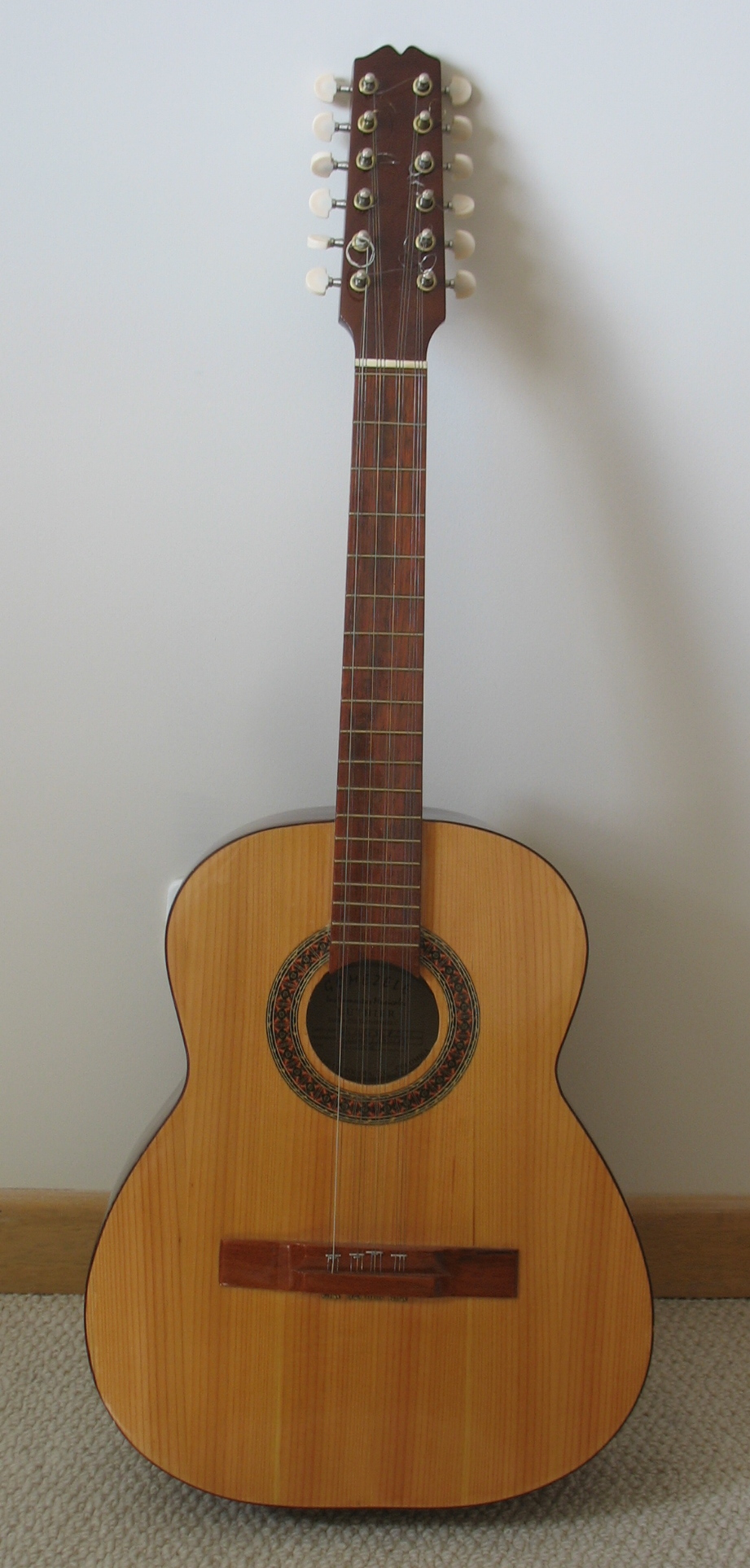
Colombian tiple

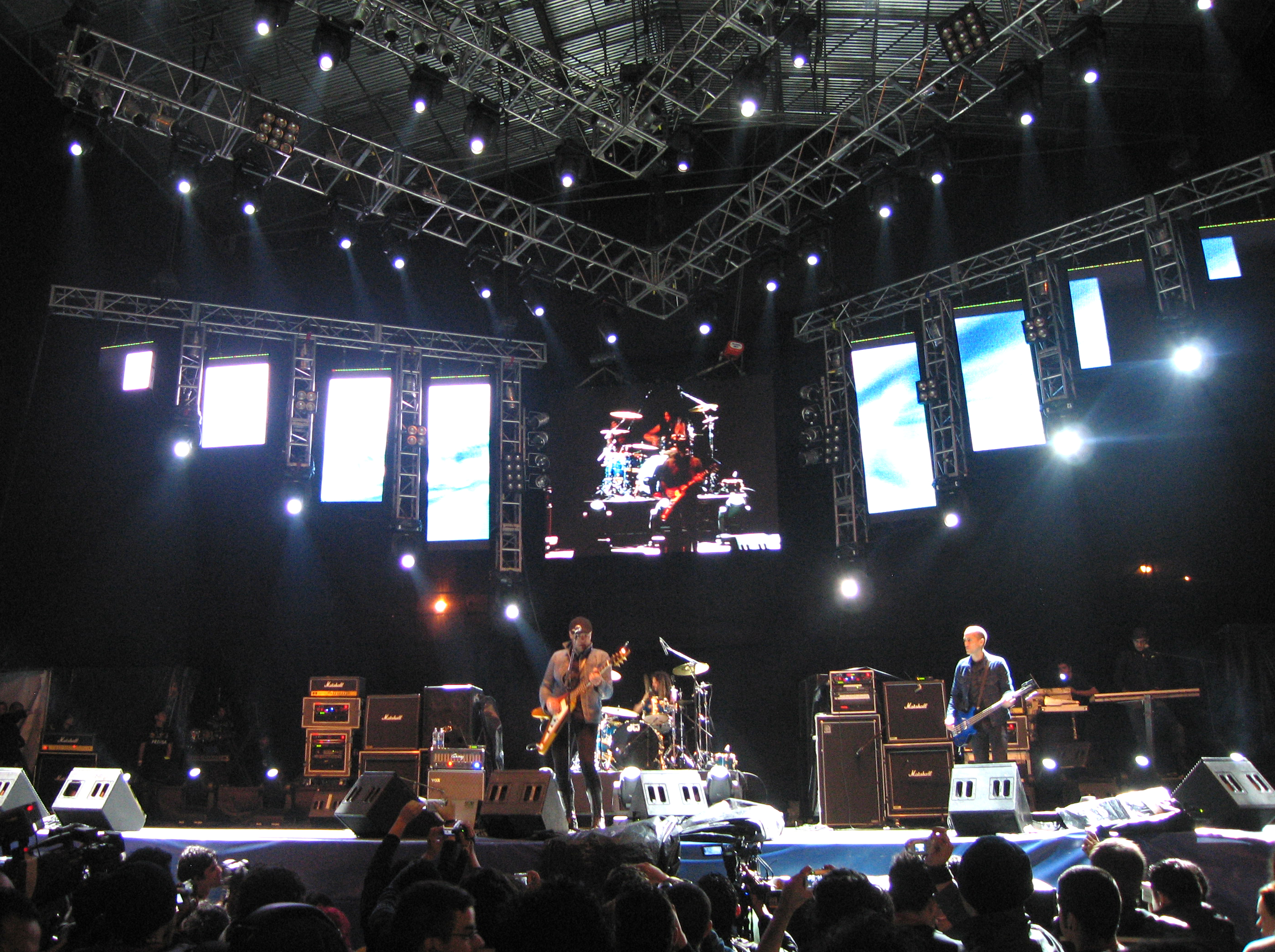
Rock Al Parque, one of Latin America's most important rock events

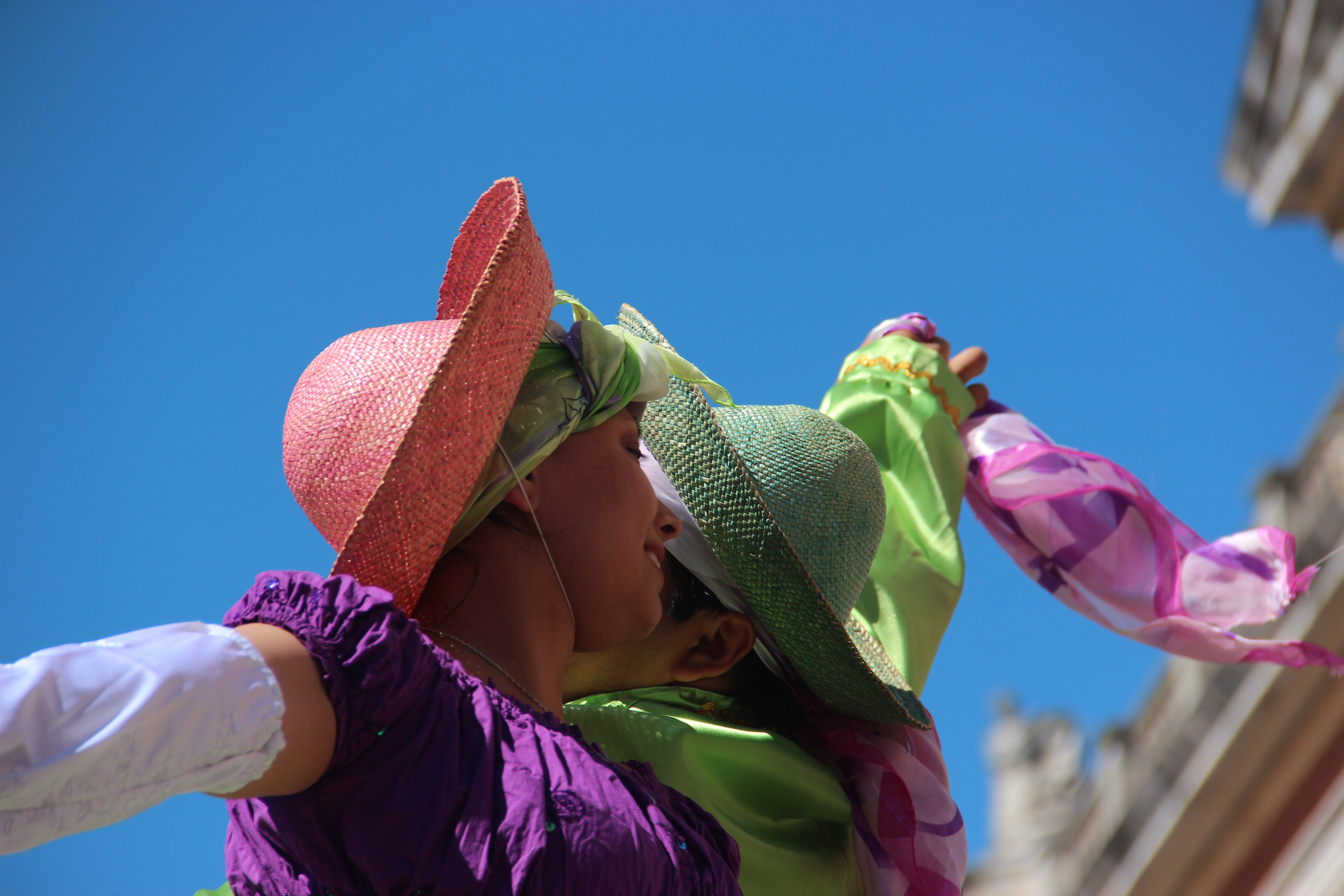
Dance of Colombia

Modern Colombian music is a mixture of Native Indigenous, European, and African influences, as well as more modern American, Puerto Rico and other Caribbean music forms, such as Trinidadian, Cuban, and Jamaican. The music varies greatly between regions but cumbia is widely accepted as the national musical genre.

Cumbia is a mixture of Spanish, Native Indigenous, and African music, the latter brought by slaves. The style of dance is designed to recall the shackles worn around the ankles of the slaves. In the 19th century, slavery was abolished and Africans, Indians, and other ethnic groups mixed more fully. Styles like bambuco, vallenato, and porro were especially influential. When the waltz became popular in the 19th century, a Colombian version called pasillo was invented. International Latin, a type of pop, ballad, and salsa music are best-represented by Charlie Zaa and Joe Arroyo, respectively.

Music and dancing are very popular in Colombia, with dozens of popular vibrant styles. The most popular local musical styles are Vallenato, salsa, Merengue, Cumbia and Bambuco. The latter is a very complicated dance with many differently named steps.

Colombian rock developed after an influence of Rock en español generating fusion of Rock Music with traditional Colombian music and other musical styles.

The musical genre of Colombian pop music has been growing recently with artists like Fonseca, San Alejo, Lucas Arnau or Mauricio y Palo de Agua. Pop with strong traces of traditional Colombian music is also currently rising. Los De Adentro and Maía represent this trend. Many Colombian artists are recognized internationally including among others, Shakira, who is the most recognized Colombian artist in the world.

== See also ==
- Architecture of Colombia
- Carnival in Colombia
- Colombia in popular culture
- Hispanic culture
- Latin American culture
- List of Colombians
- List of festivals in Colombia
- List of Major League Baseball players from Colombia

== Bibliography ==
- Londoño Vélez, Santiago (2001). Colombian Art: 3,500 Years of History. Bogotá: Villegas Editores. ISBN 958-96982-7-1.
- Safford, Frank; Mauricio Palacios (2002). Colombia: Fragmented Land, Divided Society (Latin American Histories). Oxford: Oxford University Press. ISBN 0-19-504617-X.
- United States Air Force Culture and Language Center (2015). Expeditionary Culture Field Guide. Colombia (PDF). Maxwell Air Force Base, AL: Air Force Culture & Language Center. Archived from the original (PDF) on 16 May 2016.
