= Baltasar de Figueroa (the Elder) =

Spanish colonial painter

- Born: c. 1560; New Kingdom of Granada
- Died: New Kingdom of Granada
- Movement: Baroque
- Spouse: Catalina de Saucedo
- Children: Gaspar de Figueroa
- Relatives: Baltasar Vargas de Figueroa (grandson)

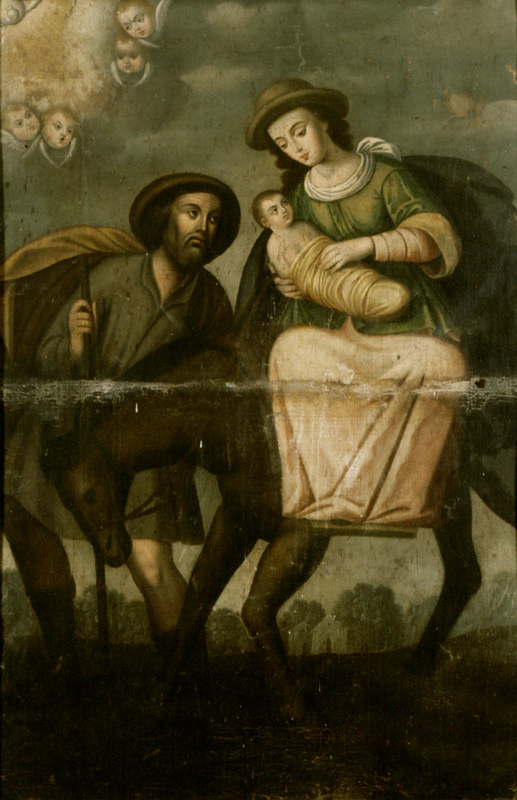
Flight Into Egypt

Baltasar de Figueroa the Elder was a New Granadian painter.

He was born in Spain around 1560 and moved to the New Kingdom of Granada. He has been previously confounded with a Seville painter of the same name.

He resided for a while in Santa Fe de Bogotá, and later in Turmequé and Mariquita. He married Catalina de Saucedo, and they had three children together: Melchor, Gaspar, and Bartolomé. His grandson, Baltasar Vargas de Figueroa, was also a painter.

He and his children worked as painters of churches in Turmequé.

== See also ==
- Gregorio Vásquez de Arce y Ceballos
- Sopó Archangels
