= Colonial Museum (Bogotá) =

Art museum in Bogota, Colombia

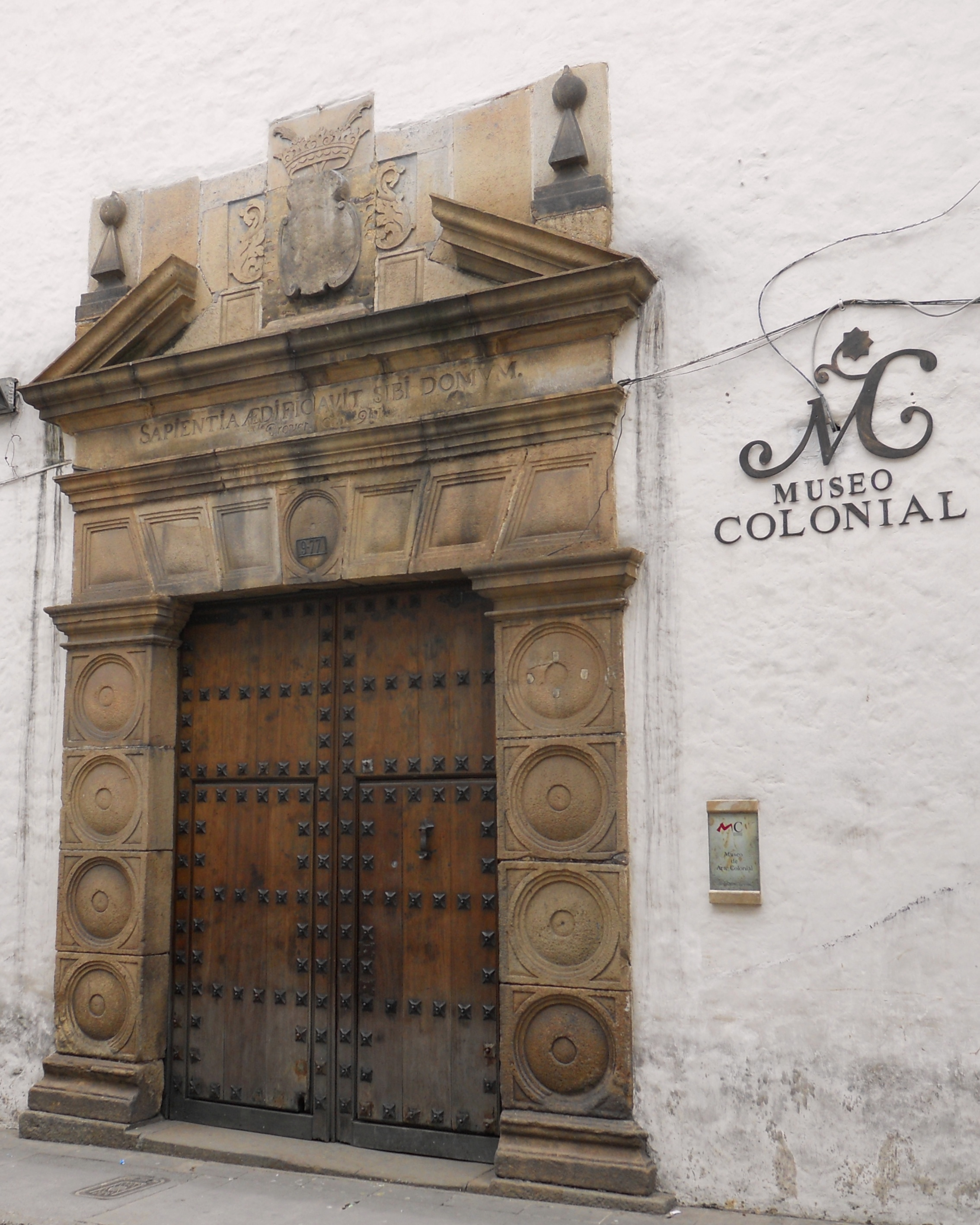
- Museum entrance
- Established: August 6, 1942
- Location: Carrera 6 # 9-7
- Coordinates: 4.5966°N 74.07514°W
- Website: www.museocolonial.gov.co

The Colonial Museum in Bogotá, Colombia features exhibits and art focused on Colombia's colonial period. It was founded on August 6, 1942 and contains over 1,600 objects.

== Building ==
The museum's building is one of the oldest noble houses in Colombia. Built in 1610 by the Jesuit Pedro Pérez, it was part of the great architectural ensemble of the Society of Jesus until 1767. The building is known as the Casa de Aulas.

It is a National Monument of Colombia.

== Collections ==
The museum exhibits paintings, wood carvings, furniture, jewelry, books and colonial-era documents. One of the most important collections of the museum consists of 76 oil paintings and 106 drawings by Gregorio Vásquez de Arce y Ceballos, one of the greatest painters of the New Kingdom of Granada.

== Gallery ==
Immaculate Conception of Mary by Gregorio Vásquez de Arce y Ceballos

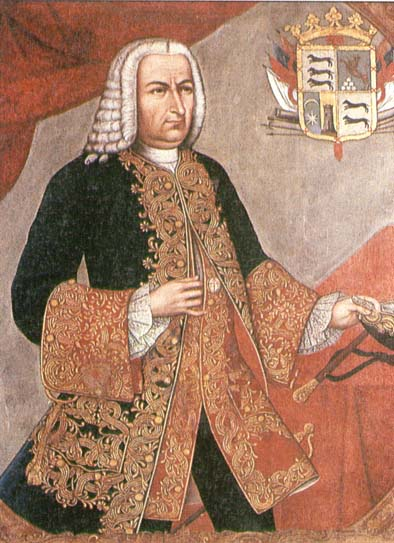
Portrait of Sebastián de Eslava

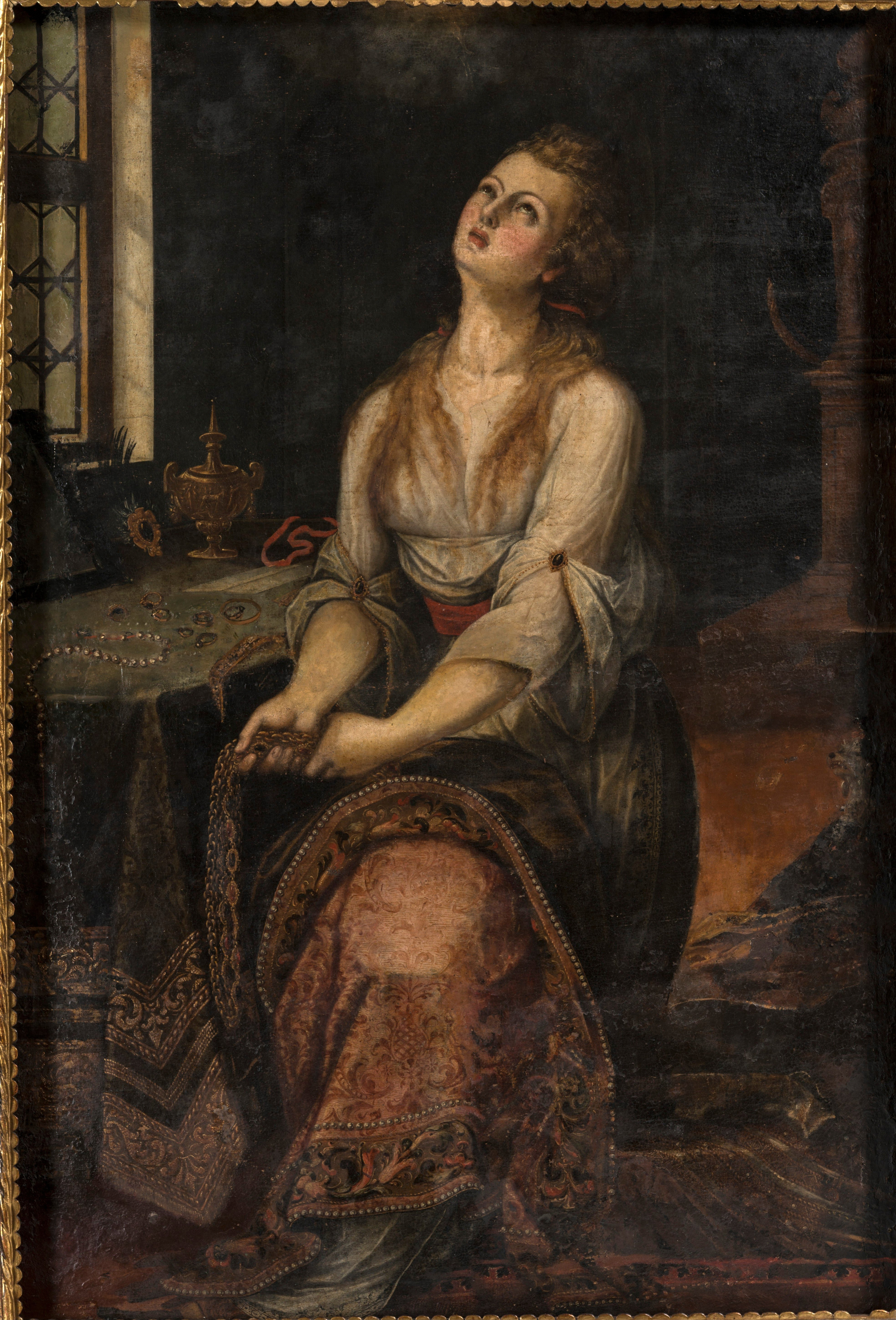
Mary Magdalene by Angelino Medoro
