= Sopó Archangels =

Painting series

The Sopó Archangels (Spanish: Arcángeles de Sopó) is a famous collection of oil paintings from the Colombian colonial period, which is located in the Church of the Divine Savior in the Colombian municipality of Sopó.

This art collection has an important historic value. The Archangels were painted around 1650, but the artist remains unknown. Some art experts believe that the paintings are from Baltasar de Figueroa the Elder, others point to the Ecuadorian painter Miguel de Santiago. A third theory indicates the Bogotan painter Bernabe de Posadas.

The national Ministry of Culture and the Board of Colonial Art developed a restoration program for the pieces, which have various degrees of damage. Twelve canvas of 2.38 x 1.67 meters depict eleven archangels, plus the Guardian Angel. Each piece contains the Hebraic name of the angel and the Spanish language description:

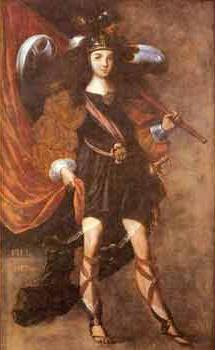
Ariel – Command of God: The archangel of divine war

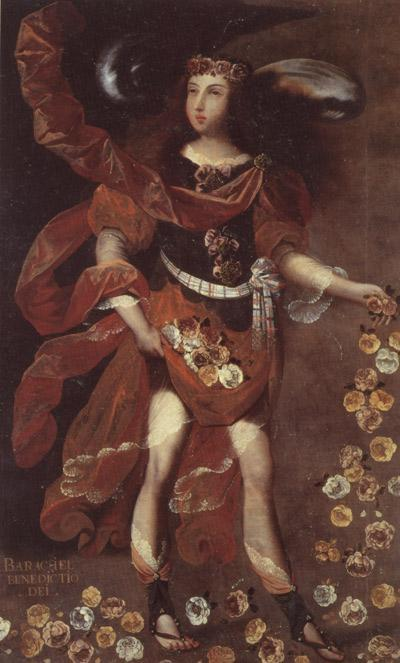
Baraquel – Blessing of God: The archangel of virtue

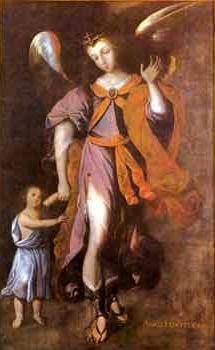
Guardian Angel – Company of God: The angel of children

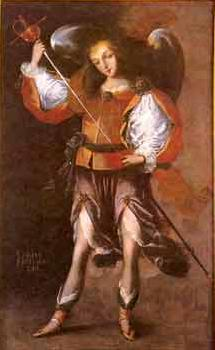
Esriel – Justice of God: The archangel of divine discipline

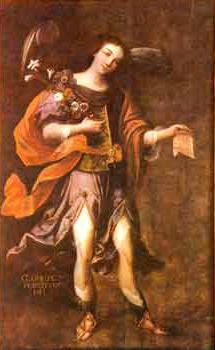
Gabriel – Strength of God: The archangel of divine salvation

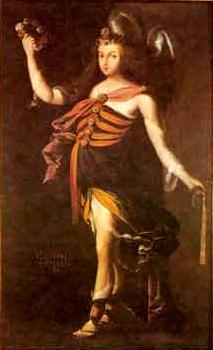
Jehudiel – Penance of God: The archangel of divine hope

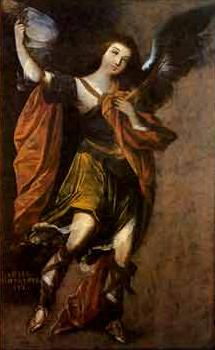
Laruel – Mercy of God: Angel of Mercy

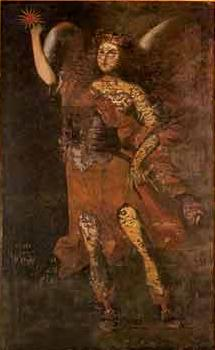
Lehad – The sun of justice. (Severely damaged.)

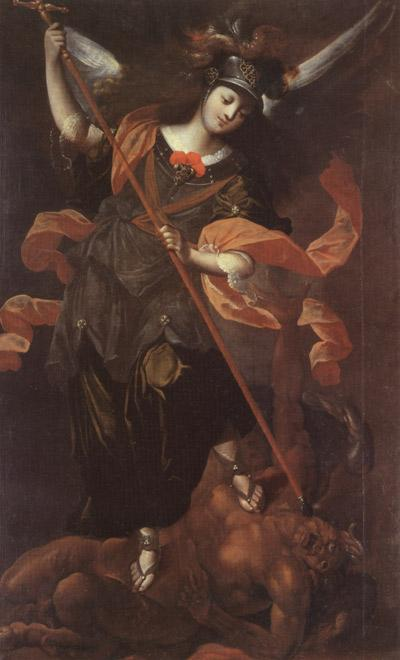
Michael – Who is like God?: The divine triumph against evil

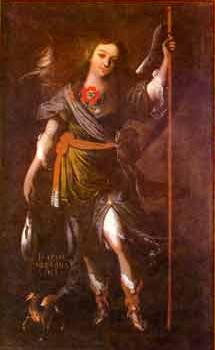
Rafael – Medicine from God: The divine healing

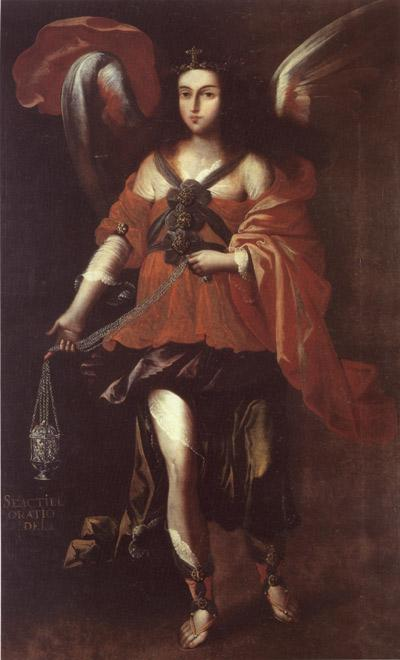
Seactiel – Pray of God: Angel of divine serenity

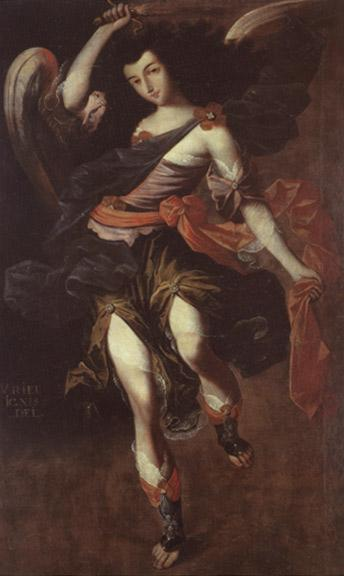
Uriel – Fire of God: The divine wrath

== See also ==
- Ángeles arcabuceros
