= Gaspar de Figueroa =

Spanish colonial painter (c.1594–1658)

- Born: c. 1594; Mariquita, New Kingdom of Granada
- Died: December 12, 1658 (aged 63–64); Santa Fe de Bogotá, New Kingdom of Granada
- Movement: Baroque
- Children: Baltasar Vargas de Figueroa
- Father: Baltasar de Figueroa the Elder

Gaspar de Figueroa Saucedo (c. 1594–1658) was a New Granadian painter.

Figueroa was born in Mariquita to painter Baltasar de Figueroa the Elder and Catalina Saucedo. He learned to paint from his father, who owned a studio.

Figueroa lived the majority of his life in Santa Fe de Bogotá, where he started his own studio. His son, Baltasar Vargas de Figueroa, was also a painter.

His portrait of Cristóbal de Torres y Motones is housed at the University of Rosario.

== Gallery ==
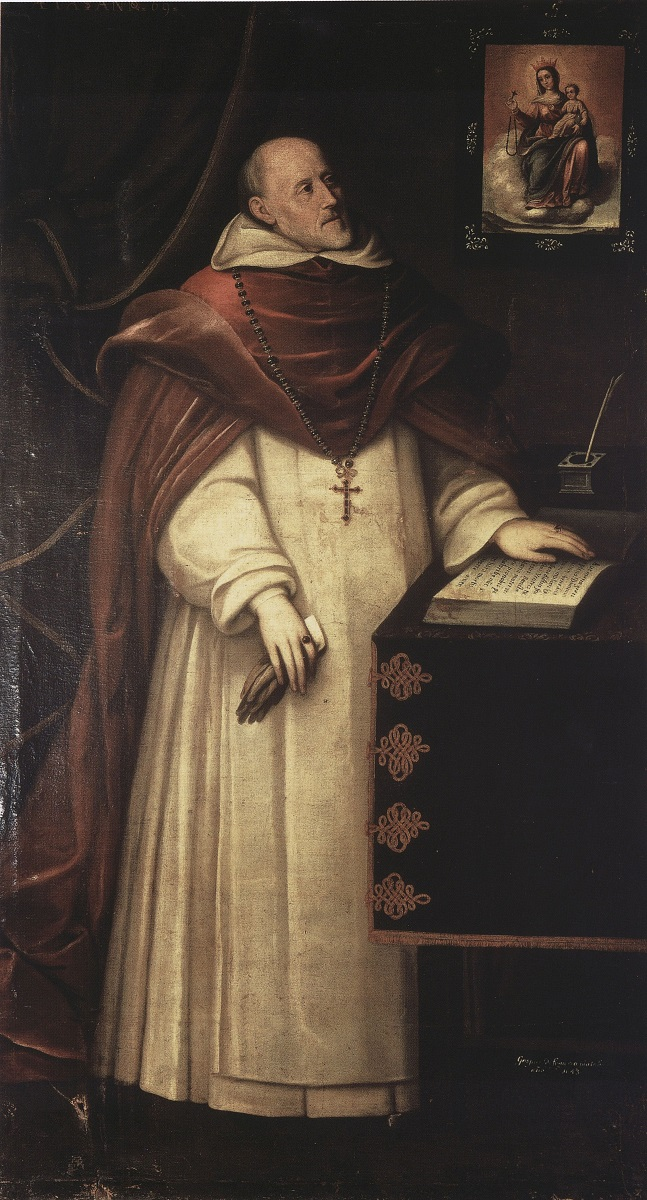
Fray Cristóbal de Torres y Motones

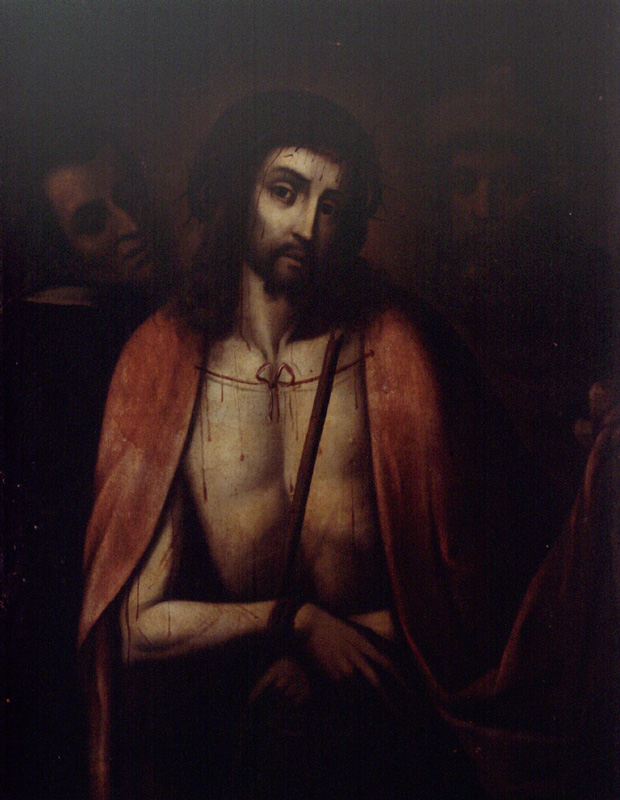
Ecce Homo

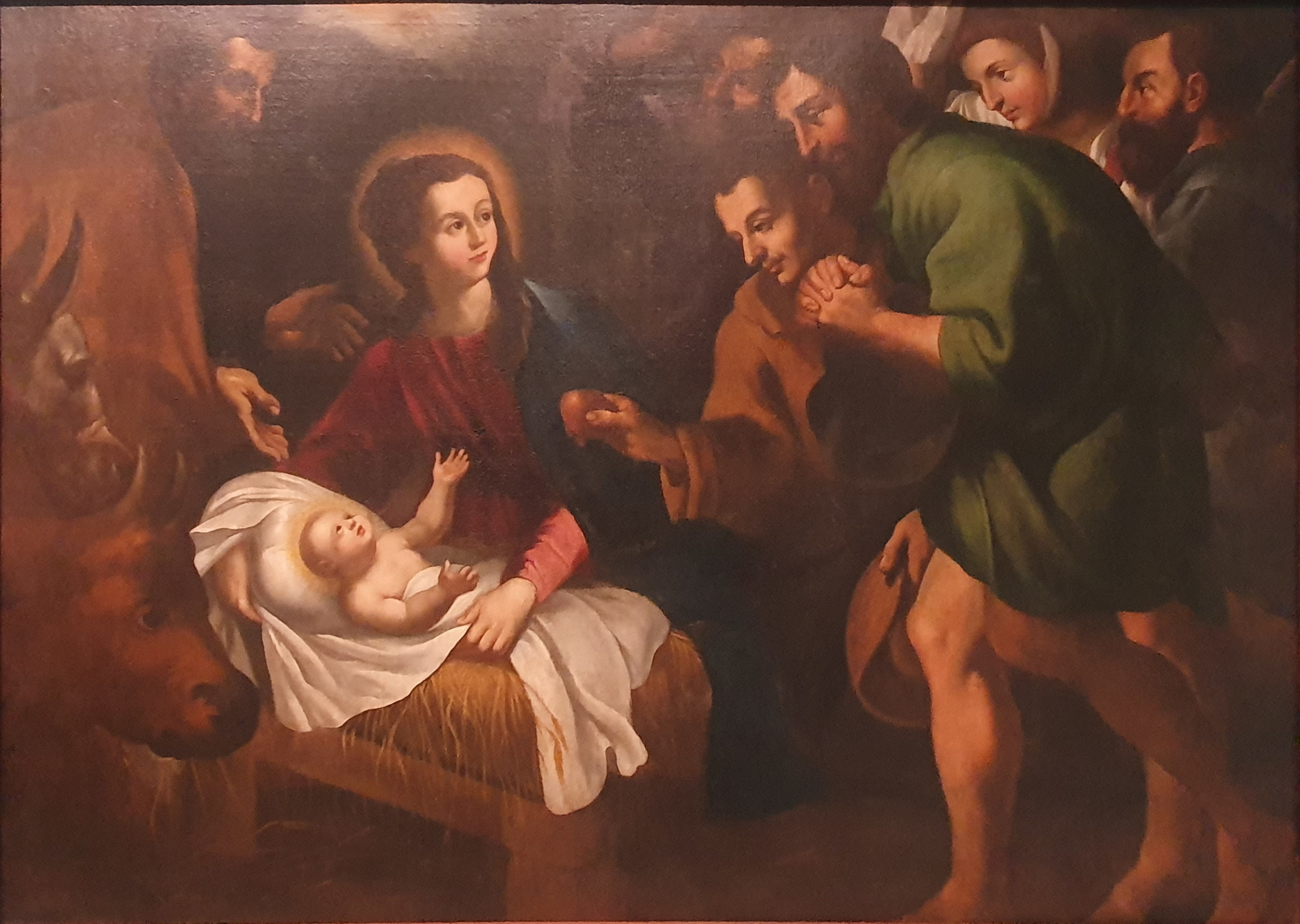
Adoration of the Shepherds

== See also ==
- Gregorio Vásquez de Arce y Ceballos
