= Gregorio Vásquez de Arce y Ceballos =

Spanish painter and artist

Gregorio Vásquez
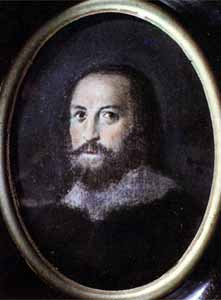
- Self-portrait, 1685
- Born: Gregorio Vasquez de Arce y Ceballos; May 9, 1638; Santa Fe de Bogotá, New Kingdom of Granada
- Died: August 6, 1711 (aged 73); Santa Fe de Bogotá
- Known for: Painting
- Notable work: The Final Judgement (1673); The Immaculate Conception (1697)
- Movement: Baroque

Gregorio Vásquez de Arce y Ceballos (May 9, 1638 – August 6, 1711), commonly referred to as Gregorio Vásquez, was a Spanish Neogranadine painter, one of the leading artists of the Hispanic American Baroque movement, which extended from the mid 17th to the late 18th century in the Viceroyalty of New Granada. Most of the artwork of Vásquez depicts the life of Christ, Virgin Mary, the Saints and scenes of the New Testament.

Vásquez was born in Bogotá, in a criollo family of Andalusian origin. The Vásquez family emigrated from Seville, Spain in the 16th century. He received art classes in the St Bartolome College and as apprentice of the painter Baltasar Vargas de Figueroa.

In 1701, Vásquez went to prison due to his involvement with the kidnapping of Doña María Teresa de Orgaz from the Santa Clara Convent. When he left prison, he got into deep poverty and went insane, never to paint again. Finally, he died in 1711 in Bogotá. In 1863 the Colombian government placed a commemorative plaque in the house where Vasquez was born and died (Calle 11 No. 3-99).

== Gallery ==
Allegory of the Immaculate Conception

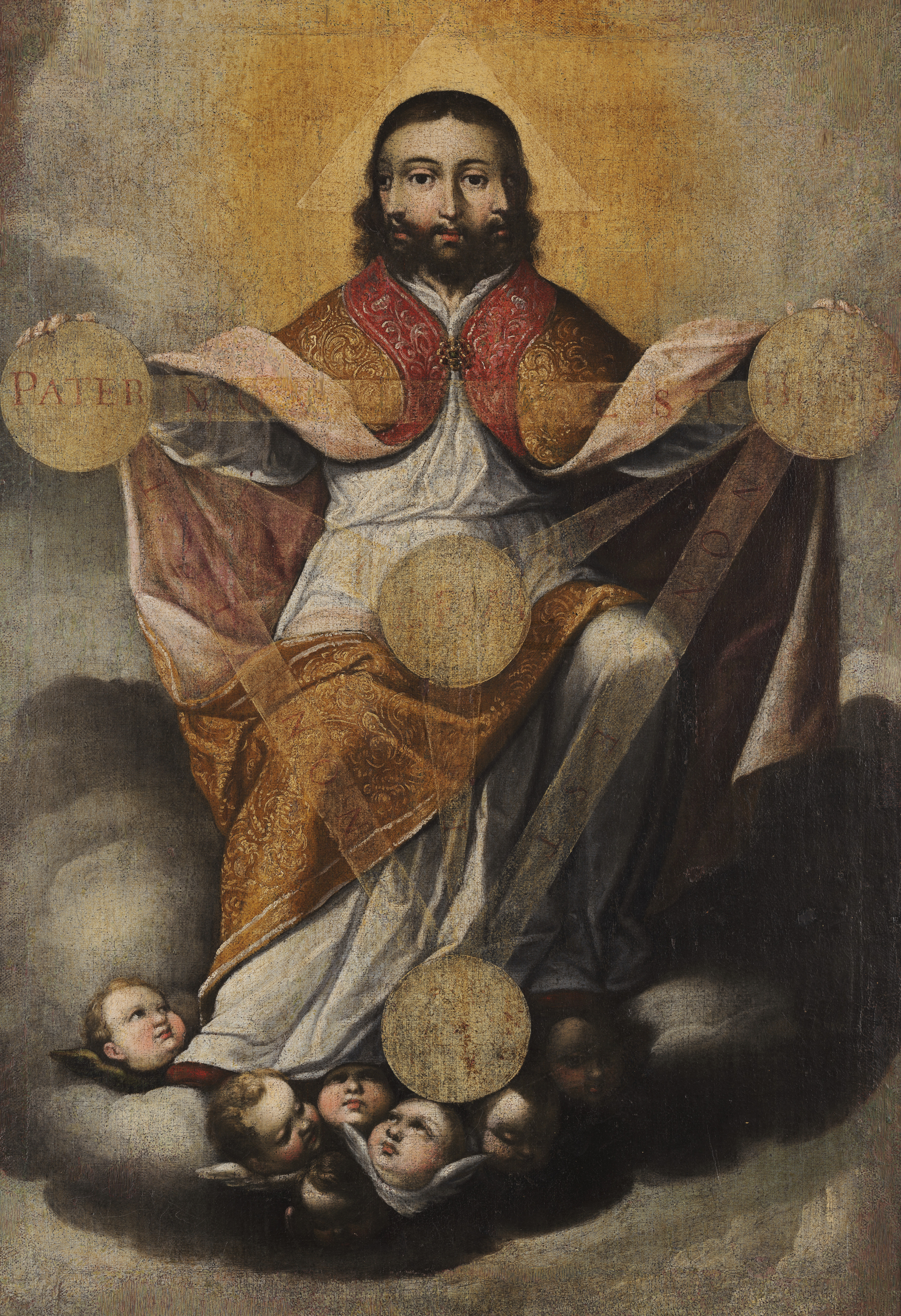
"Holy Trinity", by Gregorio Vásquez de Arce y Ceballos.

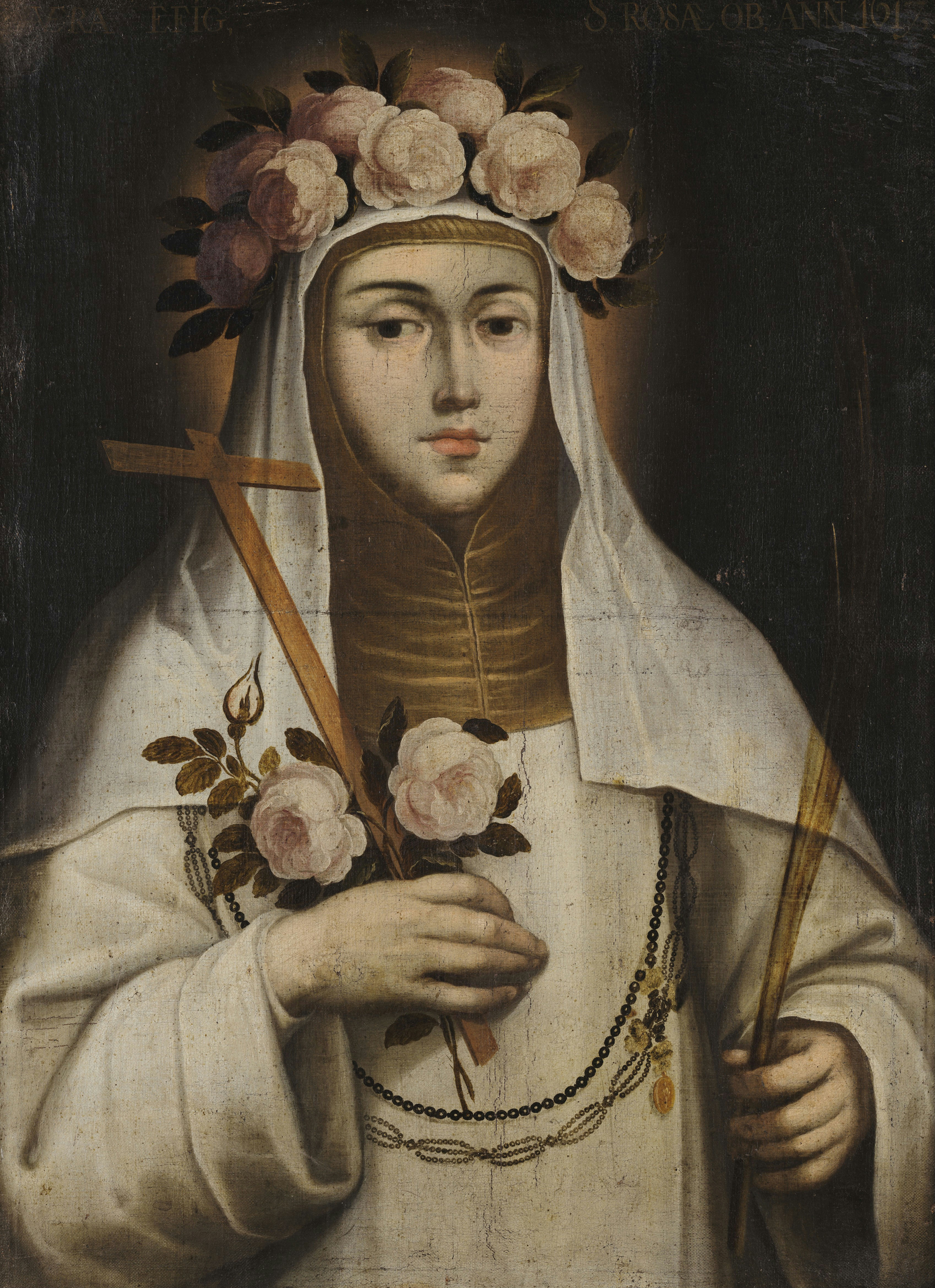
Saint Rose of Lima (1680) by Gregorio Vásquez de Arce y Ceballos. Colonial Art Museum of Bogotá.

== See also ==
- Gaspar de Figueroa
