= Baltasar Vargas de Figueroa =

Spanish colonial painter (1629–1667)

- Born: April 23, 1629; Santa Fe de Bogotá, New Kingdom of Granada
- Died: February 19, 1667 (aged 37); Santa Fe de Bogotá, New Kingdom of Granada
- Movement: Baroque
- Father: Gaspar de Figueroa
- Relatives: Baltasar de Figueroa the Elder (grandfather)

Baltasar Vargas de Figueroa (April 23, 1629–February 19, 1667) was a New Granadian painter.

Figueroa was born in Bogotá to painter Gaspar de Figueroa and Lorenza de Vargas. His grandfather, Baltasar de Figueroa the Elder, was also a painter.

He learned to paint in his father's studio in Bogotá.

== Gallery ==
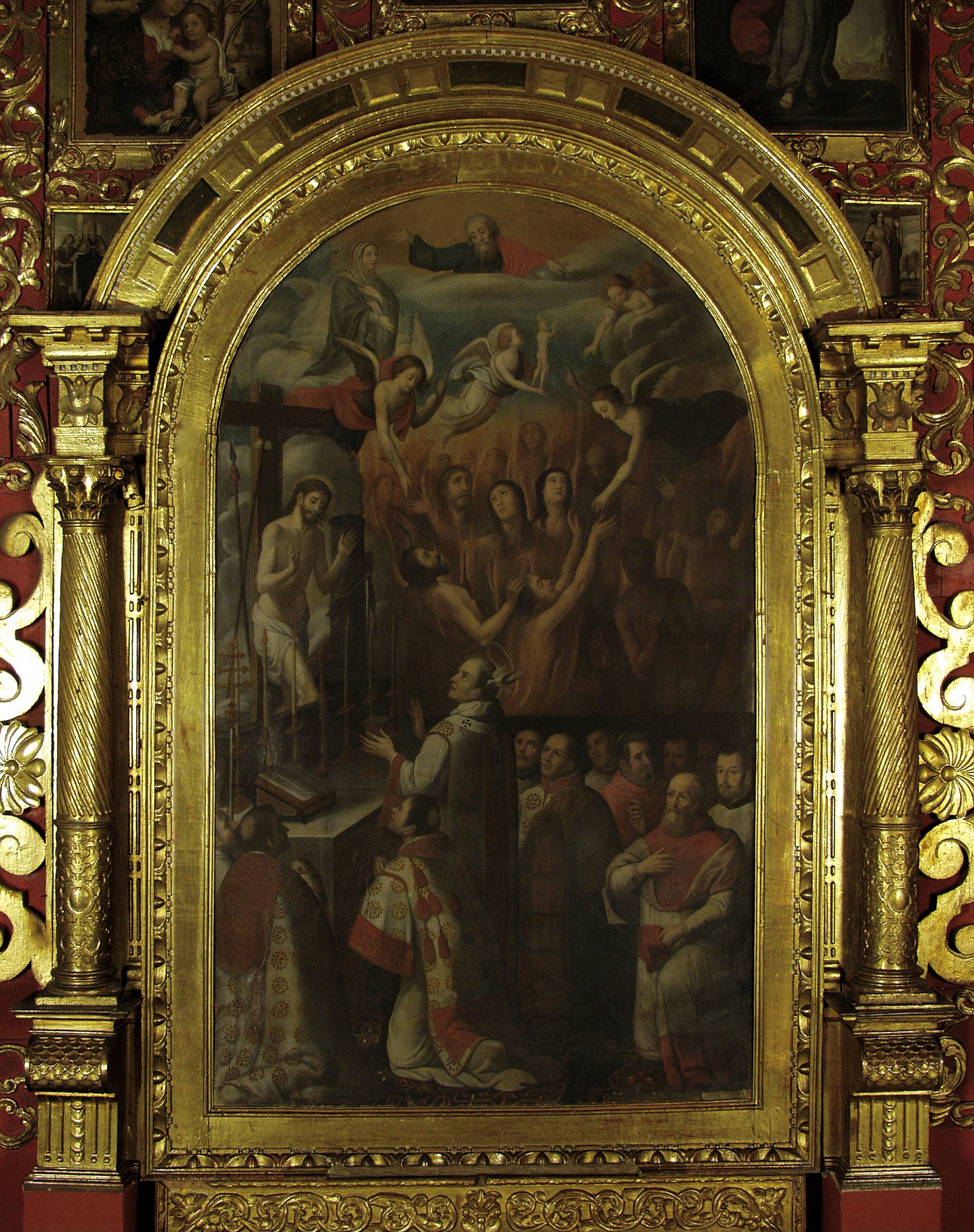
Mass of St. Gregory at the Santa Clara Church Museum

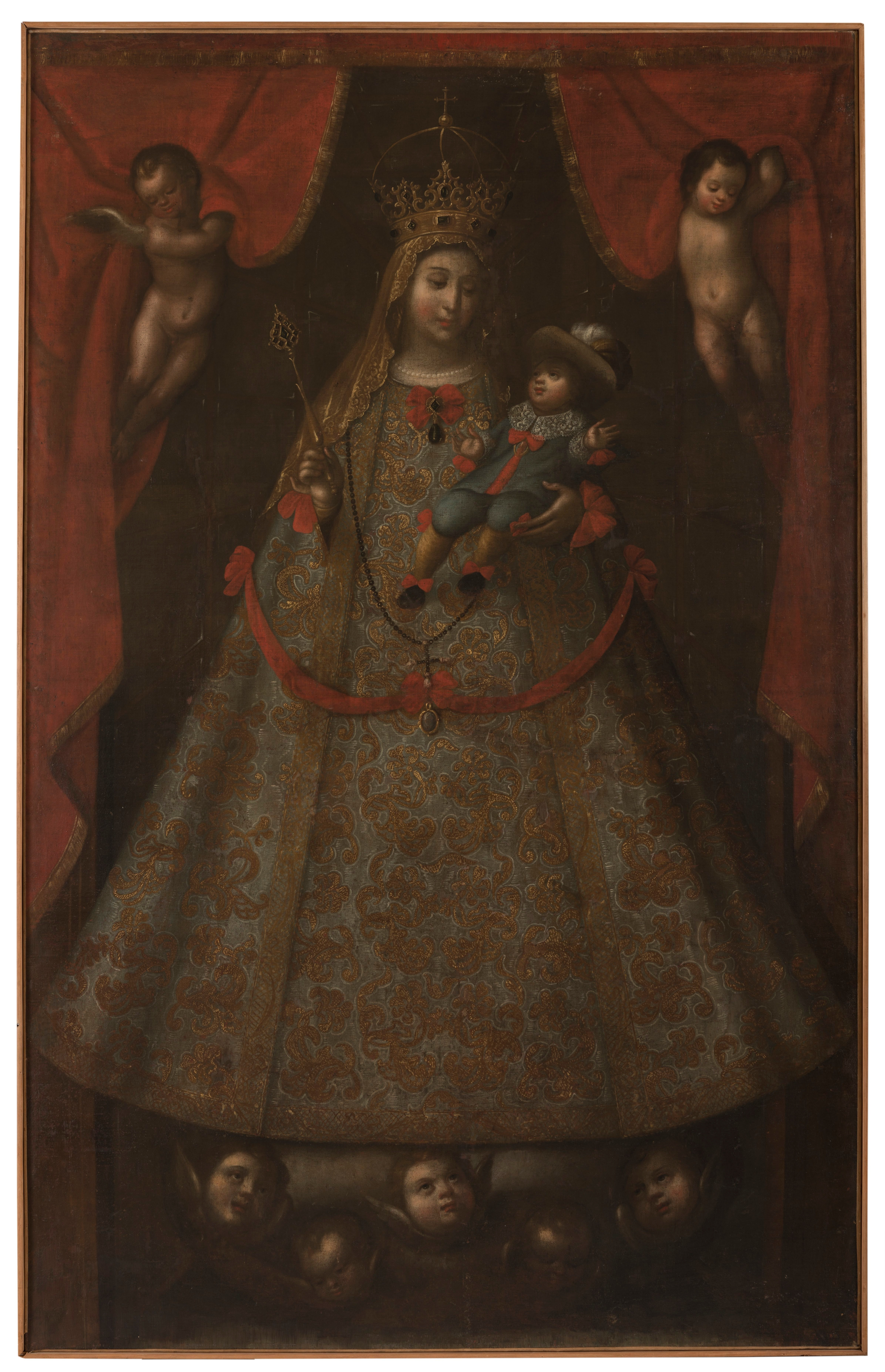
Virgin of the Rosary

== See also ==
- Gregorio Vásquez de Arce y Ceballos
