= Colombian art =

Colombian art has 3,500 years of history and covers a wide range of media and styles ranging from Spanish Baroque devotional painting to Quimbaya gold craftwork to the "lyrical americanism" of painter Alejandro Obregón (1920–1992). Perhaps the most internationally acclaimed Colombian artist is painter and sculptor Fernando Botero (1932–2023).

== Pre-Columbian sculpture ==
=== Pottery ===
There is archaeological evidence that ceramics were produced on Colombia's Caribbean coast earlier than anywhere in the Americas outside of the lower Amazon Basin. Fiber-tempered ceramics associated with shell middens appeared at sites such as Puerto Hormiga, Monsú, Puerto Chacho, and San Jacinto by 3100 BC. Fiber-tempered ceramics at Monsú have been dated to 5940 radiocarbon years before present. The fiber-tempered pottery at Puerto Hormiga was "crude", formed from a single lump of clay. The fiber-tempered pottery at San Jacinto is described as "well-made". Sand-tempered coiled ceramics have also been found at Puerto Hormiga. The Piartal culture (750–1250 AD) in the mountainous region on the Colombia–Ecuador border produced unique methods of producing pottery as well as patterns inspired by animal or snake skin. Vessels were created for use in secondary burial, or the practice of allowing the flesh to decompose and then reburying the bones. These vessels were also used to hold relics and jewelry belonging to the deceased.

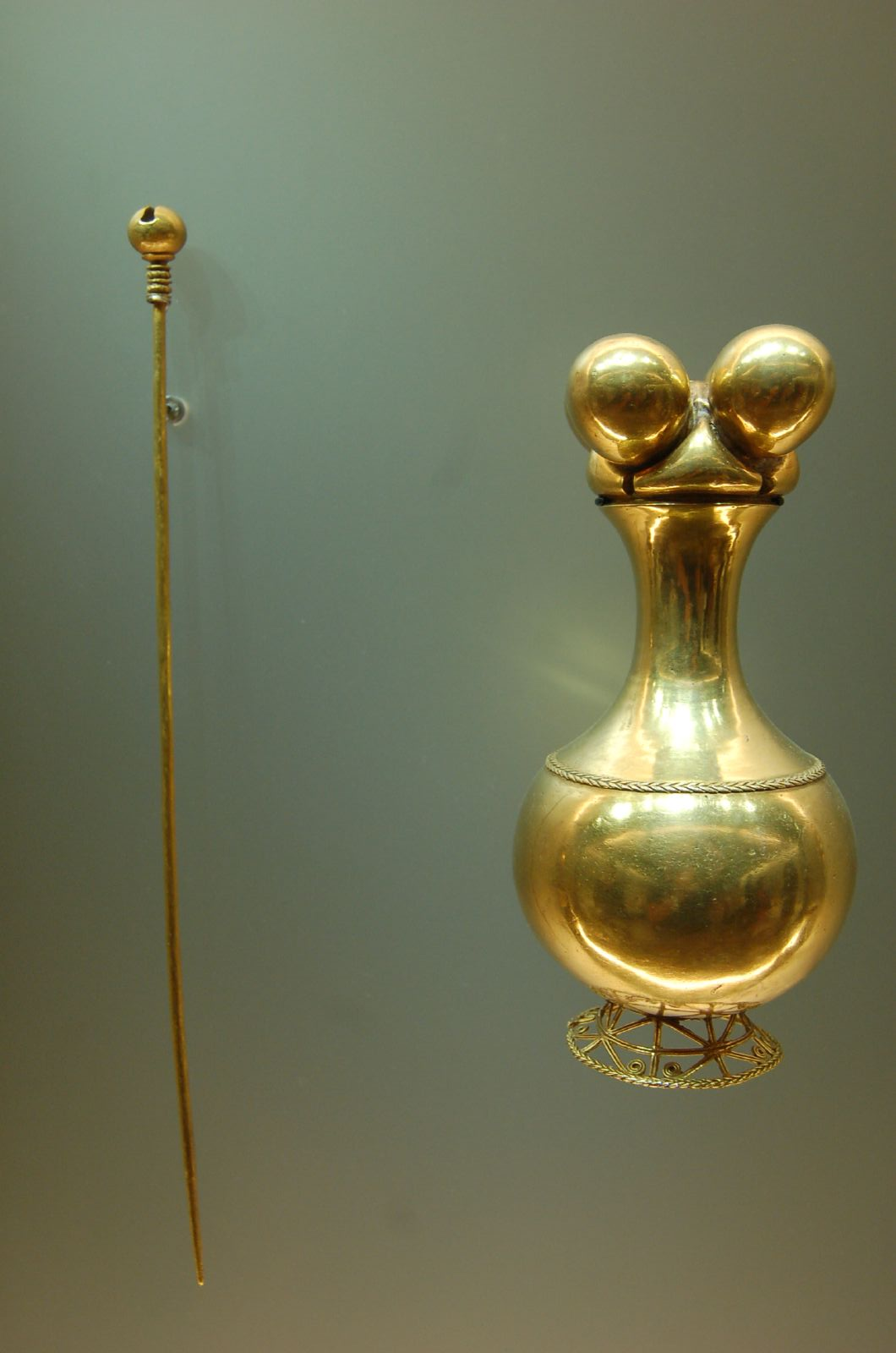
Poporo Quimbaya and pestle. Phytomorphic (fruit-shaped) lime container, gold, 300 BCE – 1000 CE

=== Goldwork ===
The earliest examples of gold craftsmanship have been attributed to the Tumaco people of the Pacific coast and date to around 325 BCE. Gold would play a pivotal role in luring the Spanish to the area now called Colombia during the 16th century (See: El Dorado).

One of the most valued artifacts of Pre-Columbian goldwork is the so-called Poporo Quimbaya, a small (23.5 × 11.4 cm), hollow, devotional object (used to mambeo or coca leaf chewing ritual) made of gold whose aesthetic harmony, simple elegance, and mathematical symmetry are striking and almost modern.

The Museo del Oro in Bogotá displays the most important collection of pre-Columbian gold handicraft in the Americas.

=== Stone ===
Roughly between 200 BCE and 800 CE, the San Agustín culture, masters of stonecutting, entered its “classical period". They erected raised ceremonial centres, sarcophagi, and large stone monoliths depicting anthropomorphic and zoomorphhic forms out of stone. Some of these have been up to five meters high.

Related to the San Agustín culture were the inhabitants of Tierradentro (“inner land”, so called because of its inaccessibility) who created over one hundred and fifty underground tombs, or hypogea; their walls and ceilings were richly decorated with geometric forms recalling the interior of palm huts. Also in the tombs were found funeral urns, bowls, and pitchers.

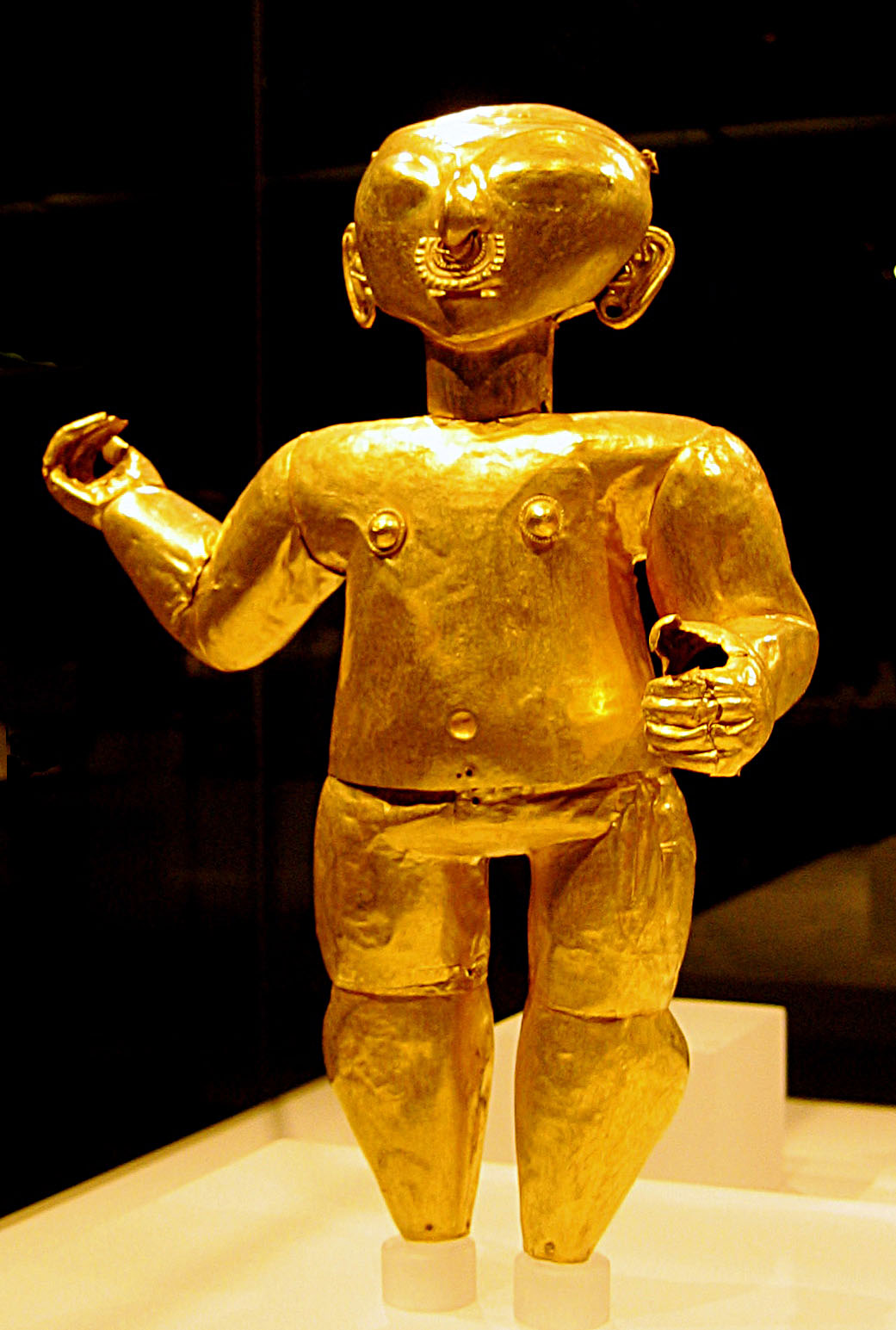
Tolita-Tumaco gold figure

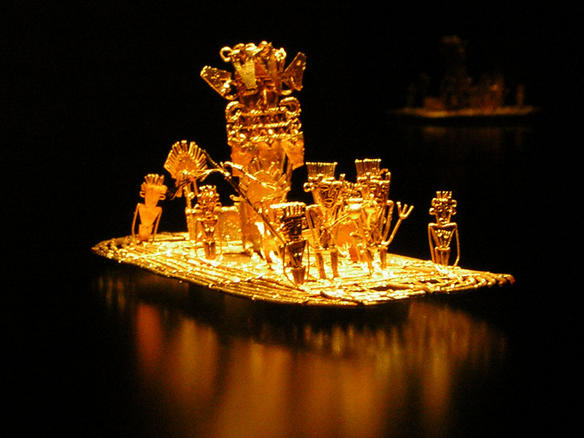
The Muisca raft votive piece, Muisca (Pasca, Cundinamarca), gold, 600 CE - 1600 CE

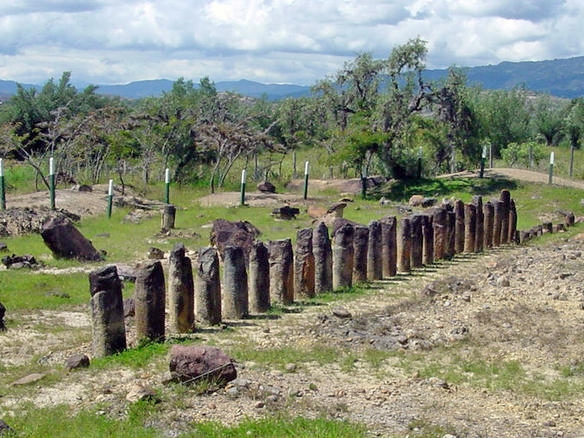
El Infiernito archaeological site

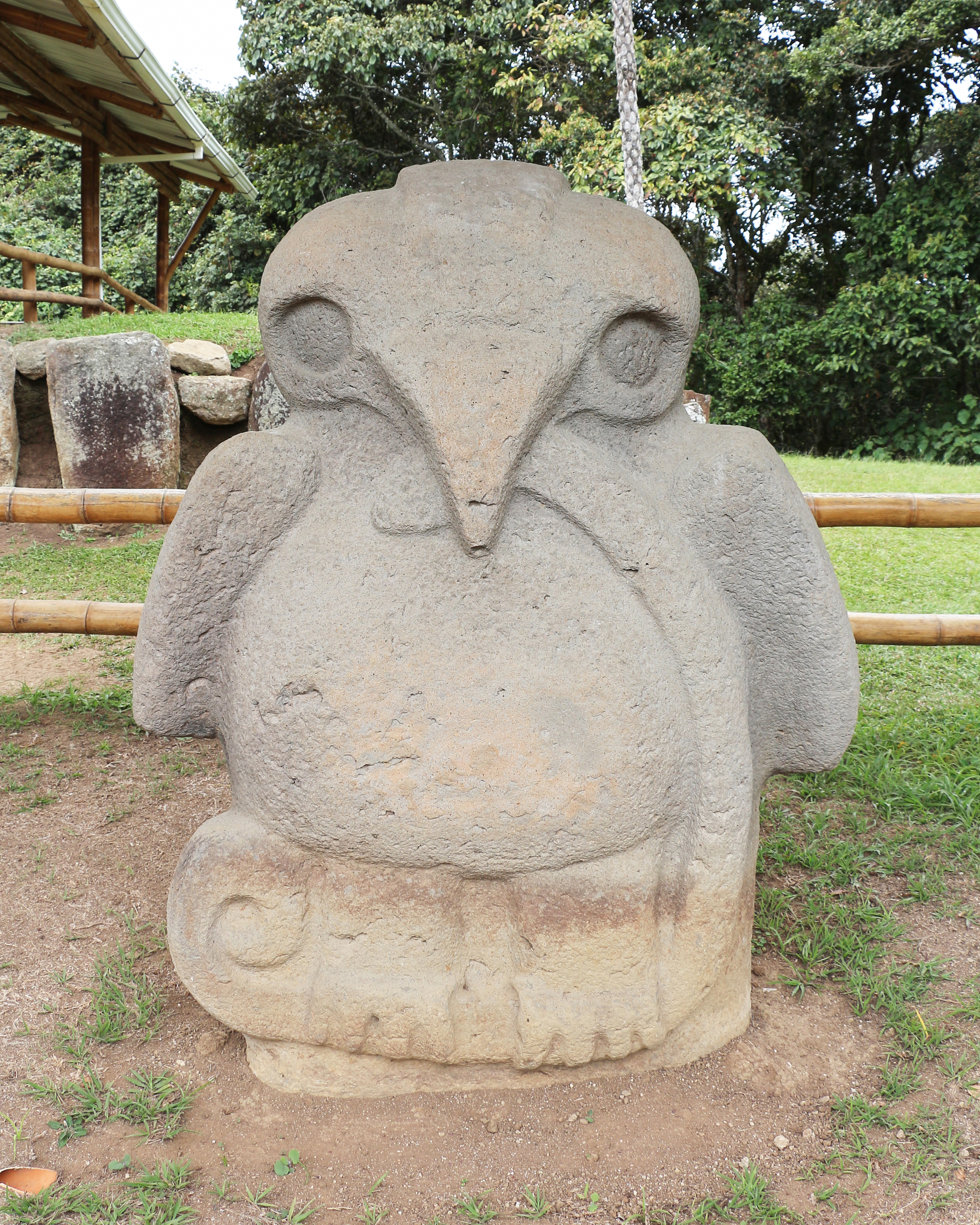
Zoomorphic San Agustin sculpture

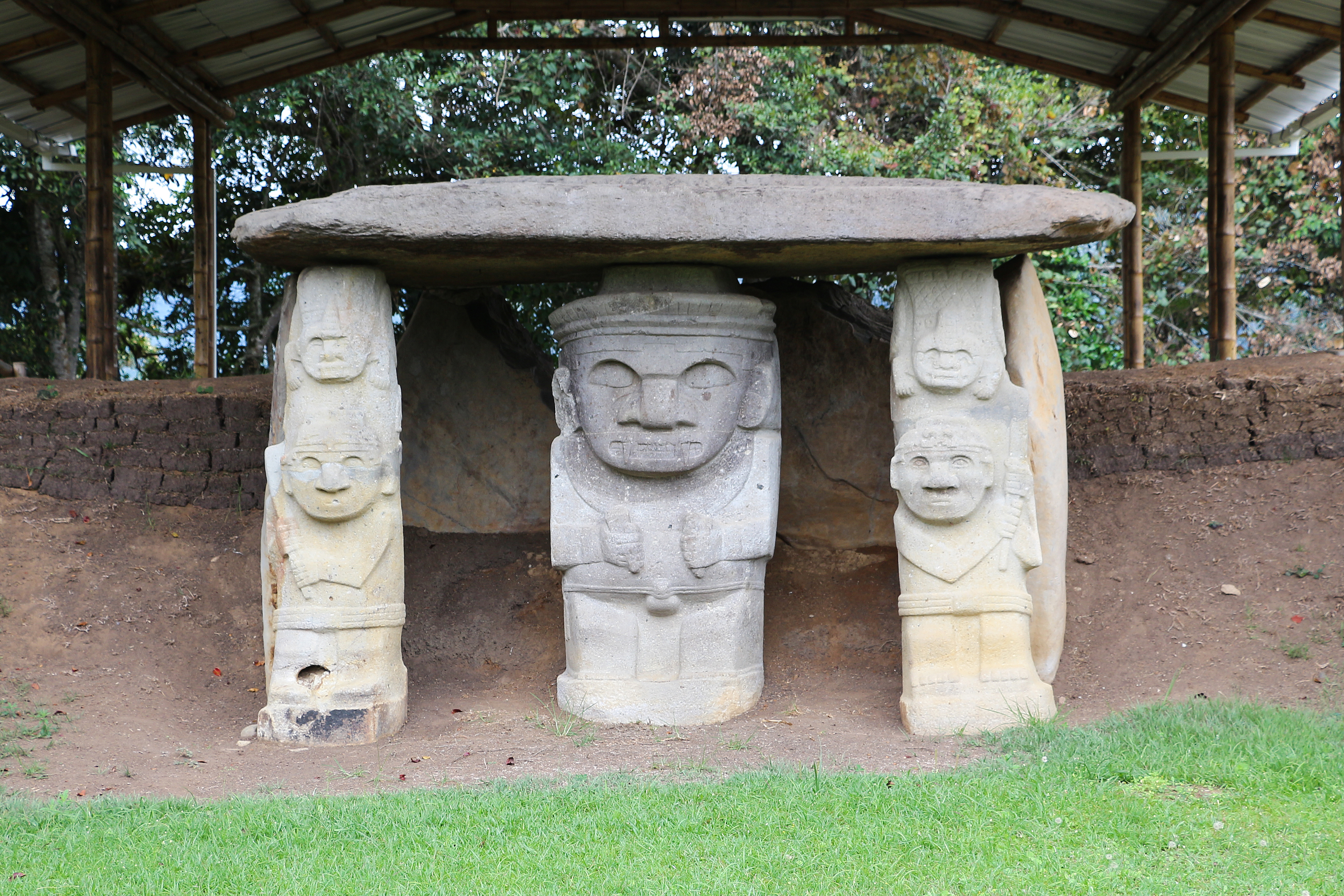
Monumental tomb, Middle San Agustín period (San Agustín, Huila), 100 BCE - 700 CE

== Modern sculpture ==
The Colombian sculpture from the sixteenth to 18th centuries was mostly devoted to religious depictions of ecclesiastic art, strongly influenced by the Spanish schools of sacred sculpture. During the early period of the Colombian republic, the national artists were focused in the production of sculptural portraits of politicians and public figures, in a plain neoclassicist trend. During the 20th century, the Colombian sculpture began to develop a bold and innovative work with the aim of reaching a better understanding of national sensitivity.

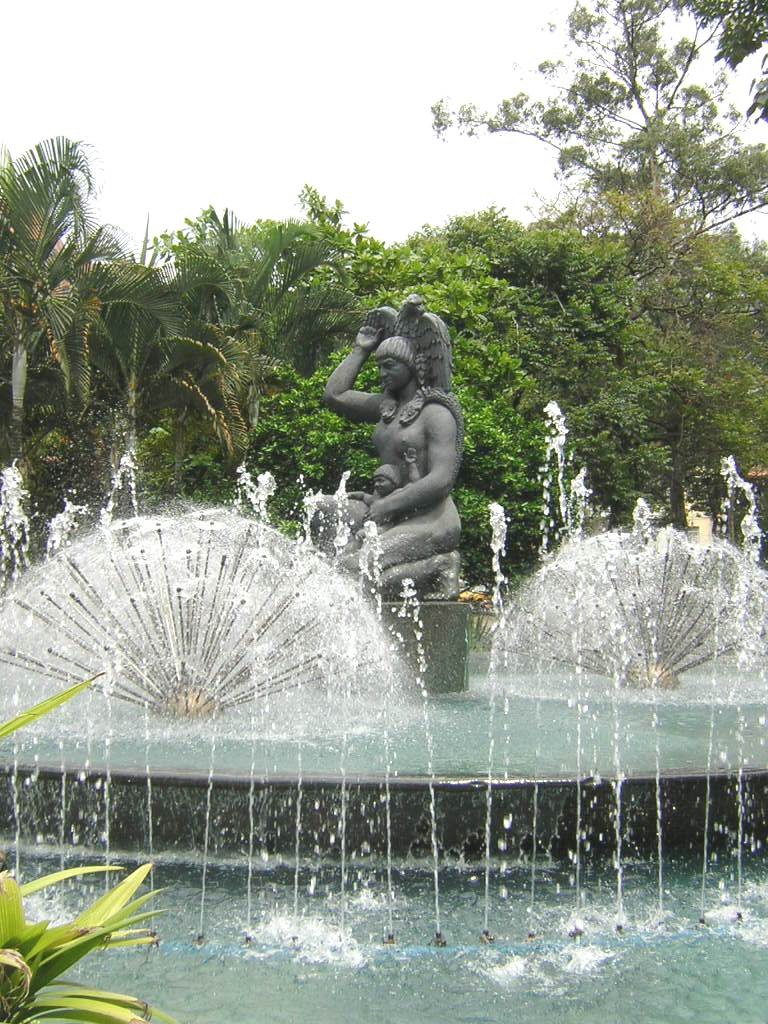
Monument to Bachué by Luís Horacio Betancur, Medellín

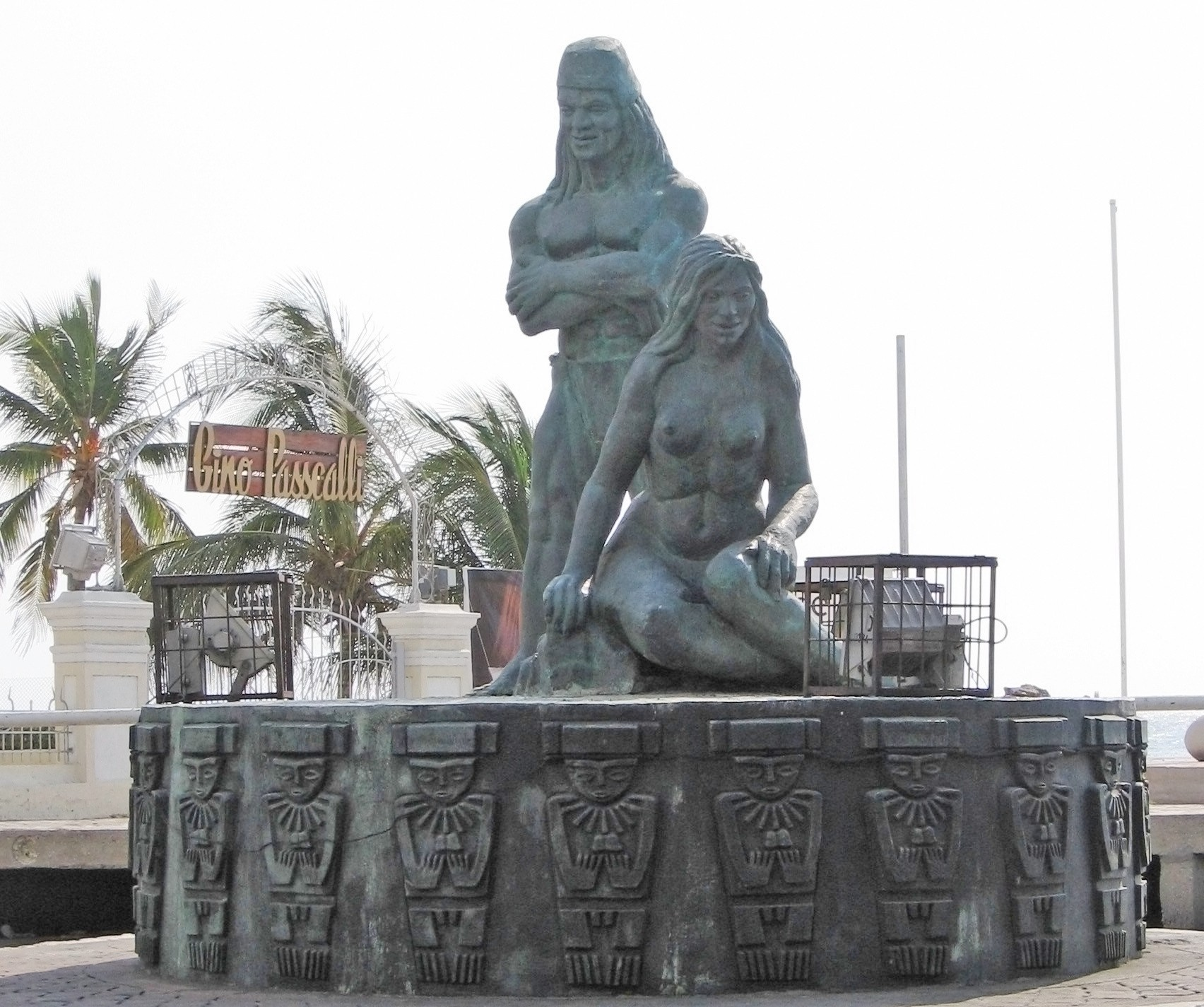
Monument to the tayrona deities. Santa Marta

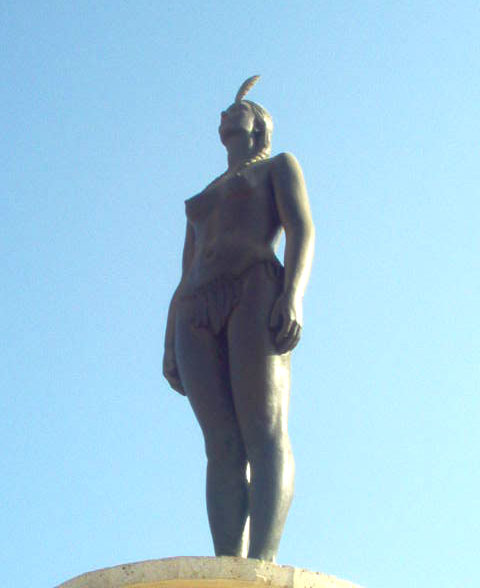
Monument to India Catalina in Cartagena

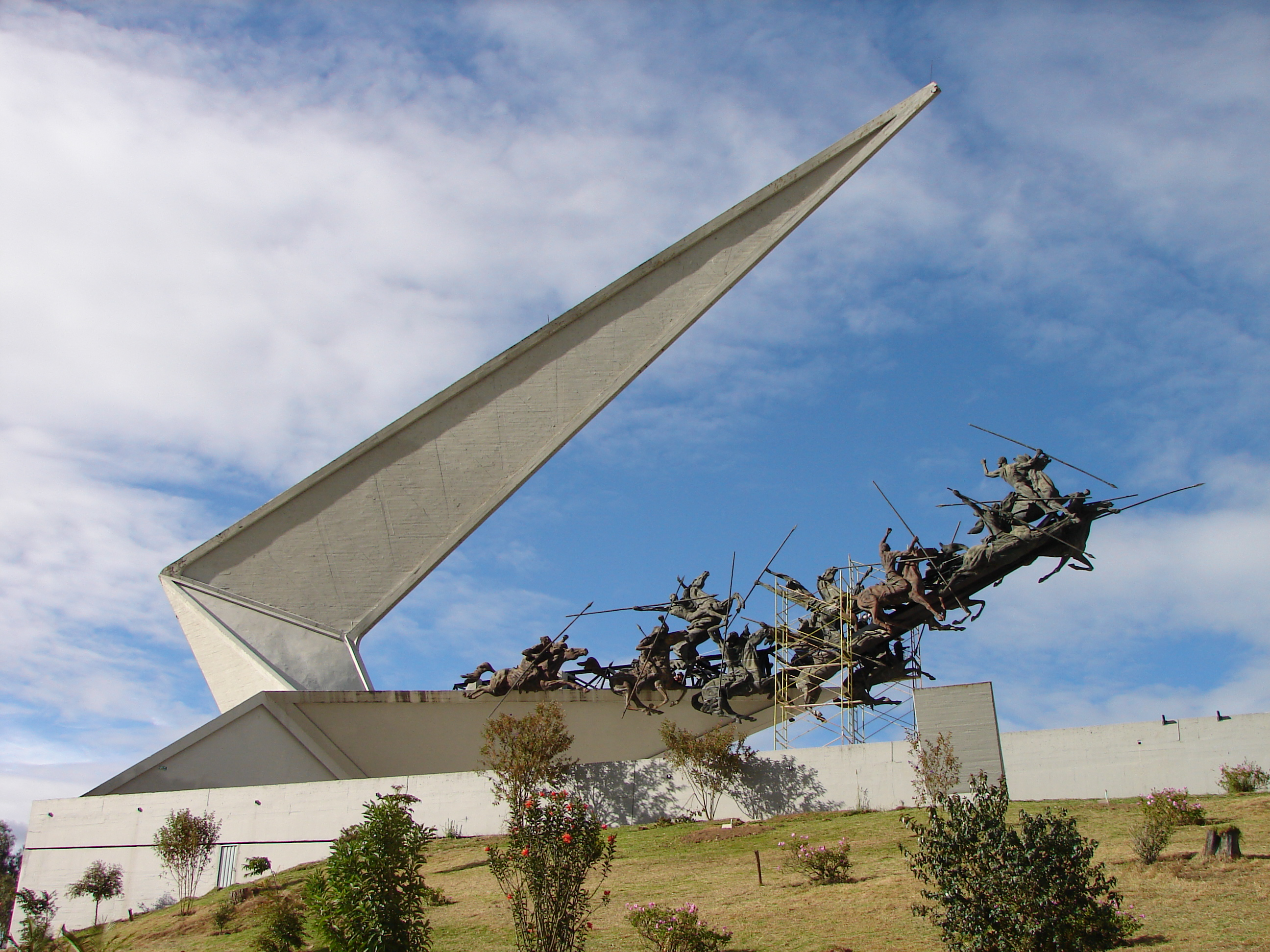
Vargas Swamp Lancers Memorial is the largest sculpture in Latin America

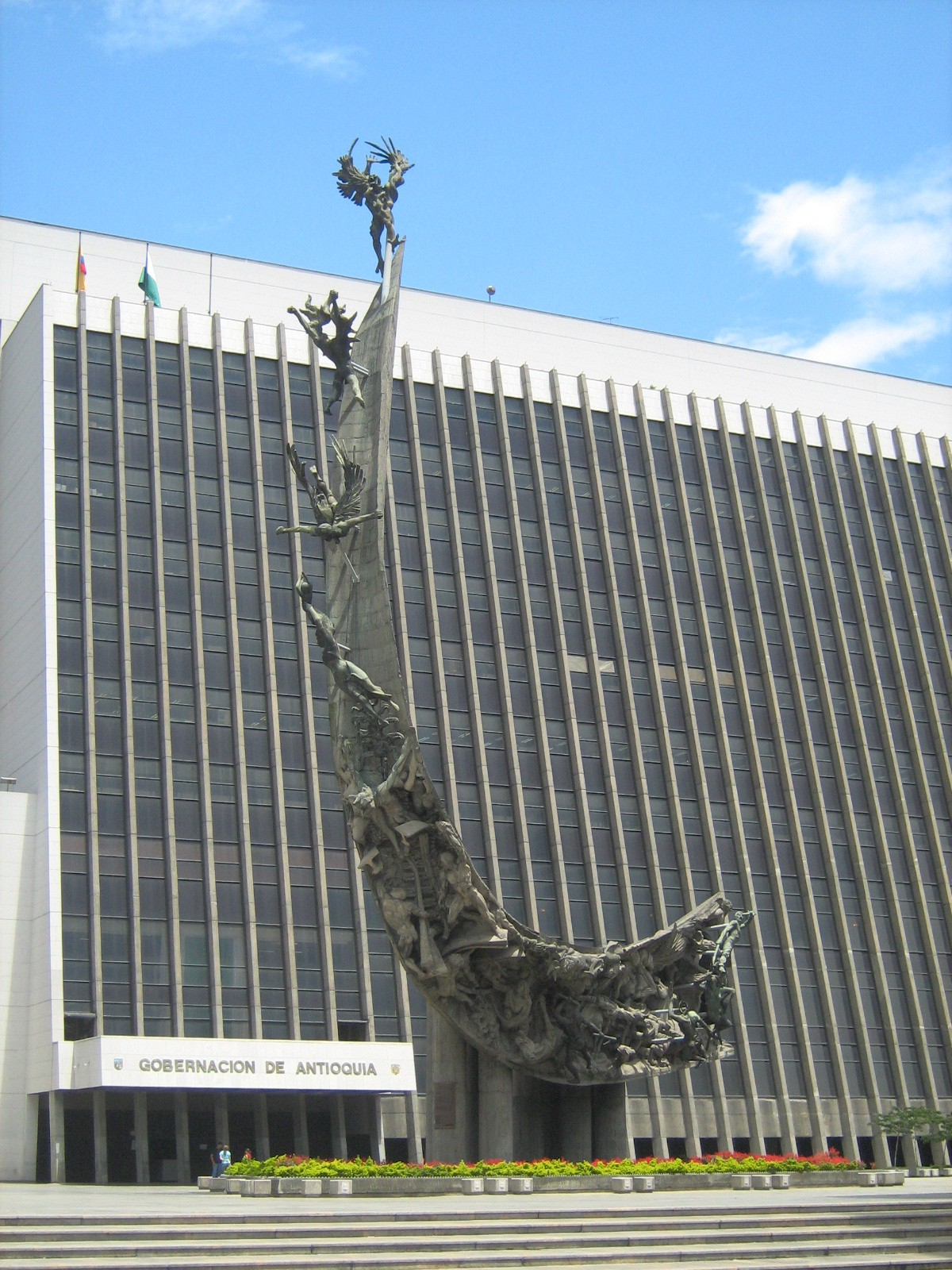
Monumento a la Raza, located in La Alpujarra Administrative Center in Medellín

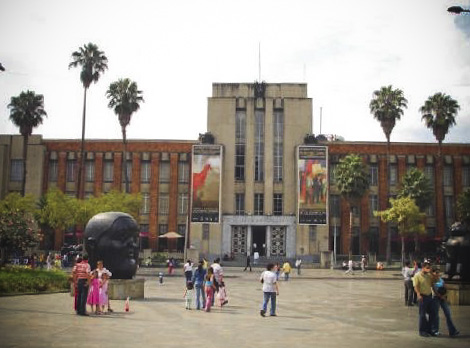
Botero Plaza in Medellín with permanent display of several sculptures by Fernando Botero

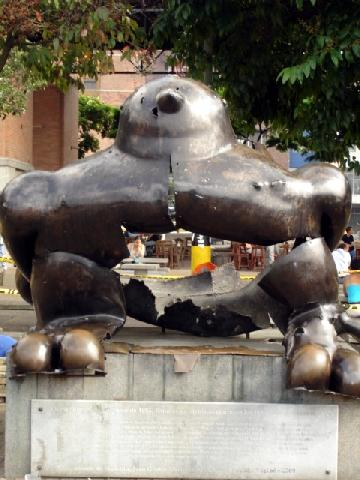
Bird ( By Fernando Botero) Was destroyed by a terrorist attack in 1997, Medellín where 17 people died. The remains of the sculpture are displayed in San Antonio Square as a memorial for the victims

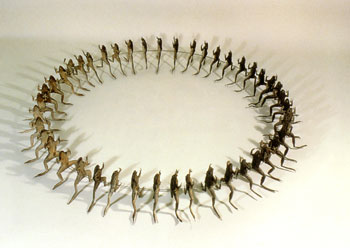
Ranas bailando. (Dancing frogs) 1990. By María Fernanda Cardoso

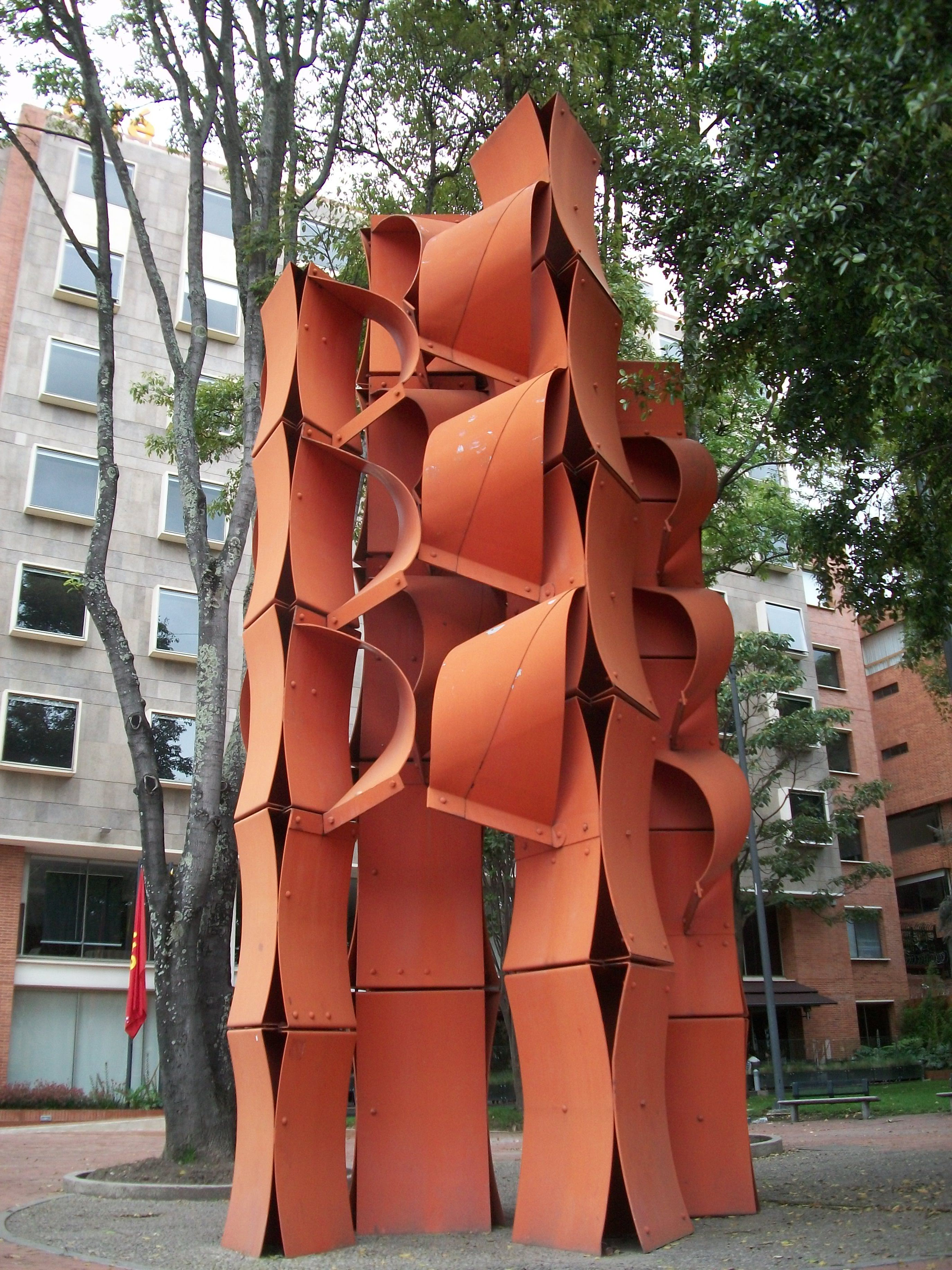
Cascada. By Edgar Negret

== Painting ==
=== Pre-Columbian period ===
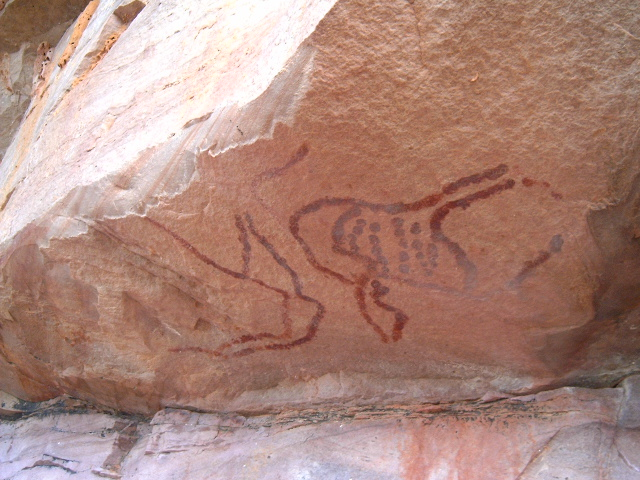
Chimitá petrographs, circa 1300 B.C. Santander Department

Colombian colonial art includes altar wood carving masterpieces and the statues for religious processions.

=== Colonial period ===
Painting in the colonial period reflected the power and prestige of the Catholic Church and the Spanish aristocracy in Colombia or as it was then known The New Kingdom of Granada (c. 1548-1717) and later The Viceroyalty of New Granada (1717–1819).

==== Early colonial period ====
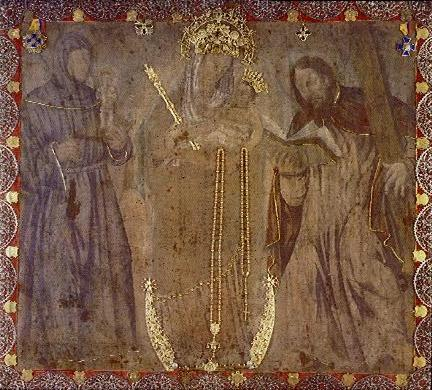
Our Lady of the Rosary of Chiquinquirá (flanked by St. Anthony of Padua and St. Andrew the Apostle) by Alonso de Narváez, tempura on rustic cloth, 16th century

Colombian painting in the early colonial period (1530s–1650) was mostly ecclesiastical in subject and based on mannerist, renaissance, and medieval styles, with some minor influence from indigenous culture.

Spanish explorers first set foot on Colombian soil in 1499 and established Santa Marta, the first city and government in the territory of Colombia, in 1599. King Ferdinand of Aragon and Queen Isabela of Castille had in 1492 year unified Spain and conquered the remaining Moorish stronghold in southern Spain (Granada); expelled Jews with the Alhambra Decree and continued the Inquisition; and sent Christopher Columbus on his first expedition. It is from this context of reconquista or the Christianizing of the Iberian peninsula that the similarly strongly Catholic colonial project in the Americas might be understood. In this period, Spain and Portugal were the greatest powers in Europe and the most dogged defenders (and enforcers) of Catholicism.

Workshops in Seville produced many of the early paintings sent to Colombia. Colombian artists in this period were mostly considered common tradesmen, like cobblers or coopers. As throughout much of the history of art around the world, these usually anonymous artisans produced work that served the ideological needs of their patrons, in this case the Catholic Church.

The churches and homes of wealthy families in the main towns of Cundinamarca and Boyacá contain some of the oldest extant examples of colonial art in Colombia, mostly in the form of mural painting.

An early Spanish colonial painter of Nueva Granada was Alonso de Narváez (d. 1583). He is credited with painting an image of the Virgin Mary (Our Lady of the Rosary) that later became itself an object of devotion, known as Our Lady of the Rosary of Chiquinquirá thanks to, as Catholics believe, a miraculous repairing of the painting's fabric.

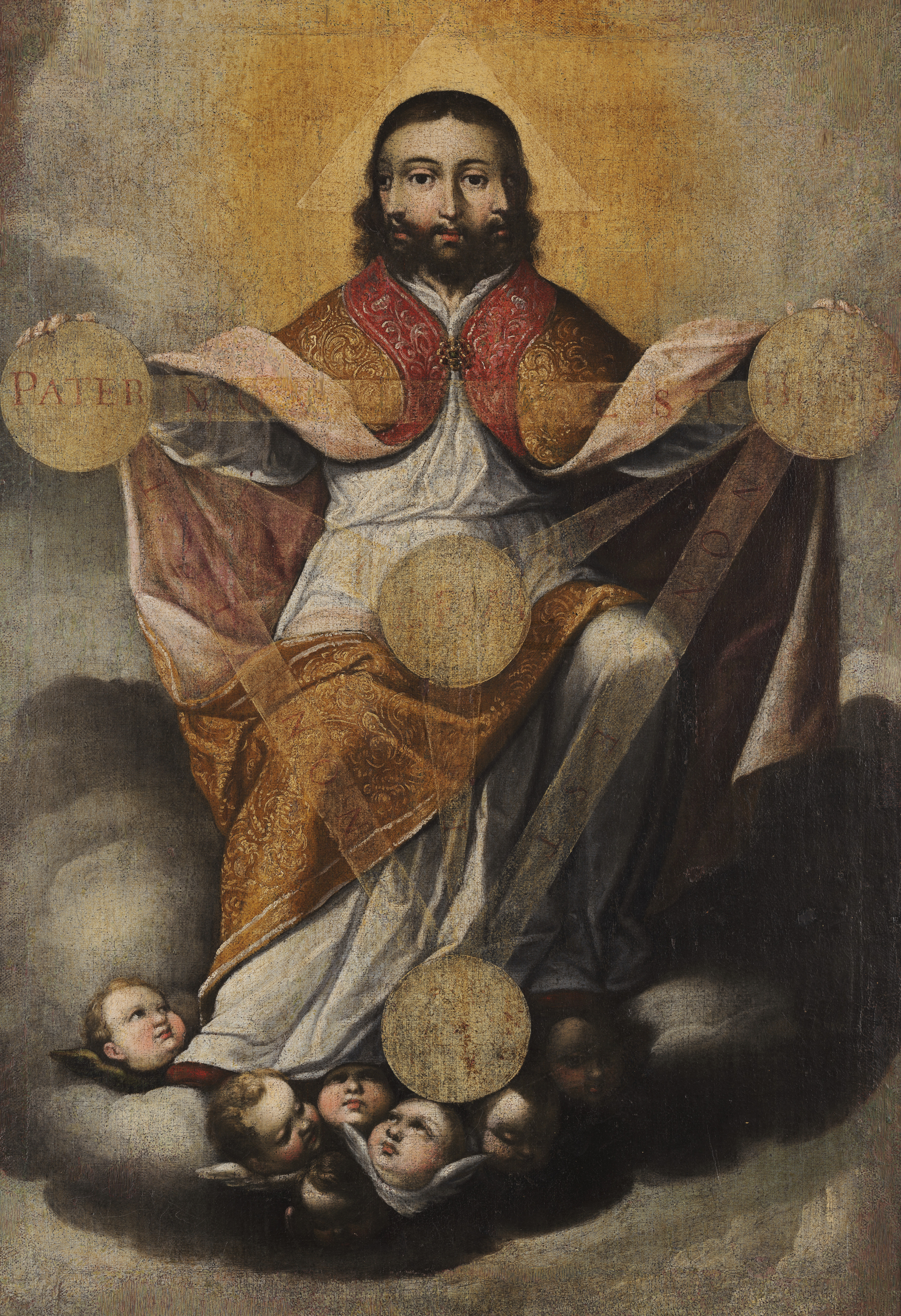
Holy Trinity by Gregorio Vázquez de Arce y Ceballos, oil on canvas, 17th century

==== Baroque period ====
Baroque art (starting in Rome around 1600), including Latin American Baroque, tended towards emotionalism, an appeal to populism, and large gestures and flowing garments. In line with the Counter-Reformation a generation prior, the Jesuits, an order formed to counter Protestantism, were the first to embrace the Baroque. The major influences on Colombian artists in this period were Spanish Baroque painters like Francisco de Zurbarán (1580–1664), as well as Flemish, Italian, and also Quito and Cuzco influences, through engravings and various original images imported for churches and monasteries.

Another Seville native, Baltasar de Figueroa El Viejo (1629–1667), settled in Bogotá in the early 17th century and set up an artist's workshop. He and his many descendants would be prolific and would invent a kind of creolized Colombian form of Baroque painting that combined the borrowing of forms and subjects from European engravings (mostly religious in nature: saints in various states of mortification or ecstasy, the Virgin Mary, or Christ) with native motifs and decoration. But it would be one of the Figueroa family's apprentices, Gregorio Vázquez de Arce y Ceballos, who would stand out among all painters of the colonial era.

Gregorio Vasquez de Arce y Ceballos (1638–1711) is considered the greatest master of the colonial period. In his lifetime he produced around five hundred paintings, mostly devotional, with a technique that juxtaposed figures taken from paintings by European masters using innovative materials found in the New World. His depictions of the Trinity as a single figure with four eyes and three faces, an innovation unique to Latin America, would be later condemned as heretical in part because they resembled Hindu deities.

The Sopó Archangels is a series of twelve paintings, each featuring an archangel (three canonical, plus eight apocryphal, and one guardian) engulfed in a tenebrous (cloudy) background. Their figures are life-sized, clad in rich apparel, full of drapes and folds, and are meant to be "read" through their various iconography. Like many depictions of angels, these ostensibly male figures are depicted with soft, feminine faces and round hips. The origin of this series is unknown, as is the artist. It is considered one of the enduring enigmas of Colombian art.

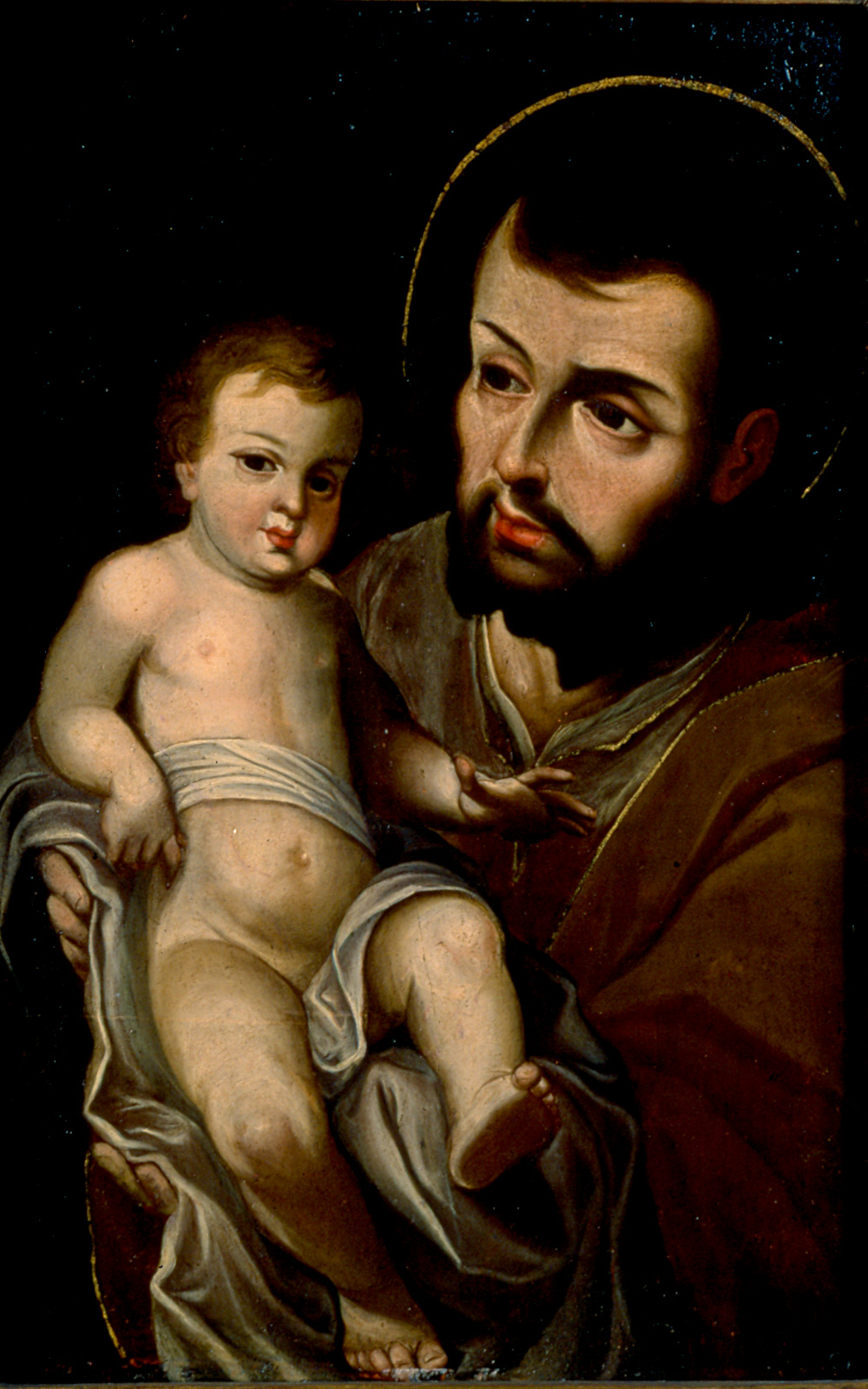
San José y el Niño by Gregorio Vasquez de Arce y Ceballos, oil on wood, ca. 1670

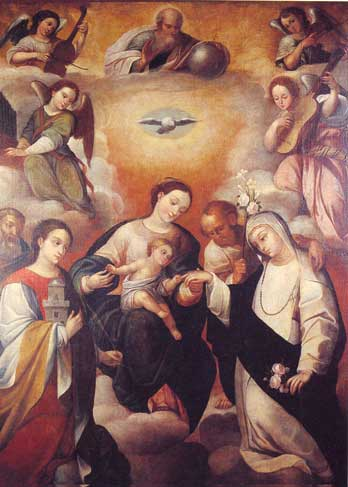
St. Catalina weddings by Gregorio Vasquez de Arce y Ceballos, (Desposorios de Santa Catalina) 18th century. Oil on canvas 176 x 130 cm

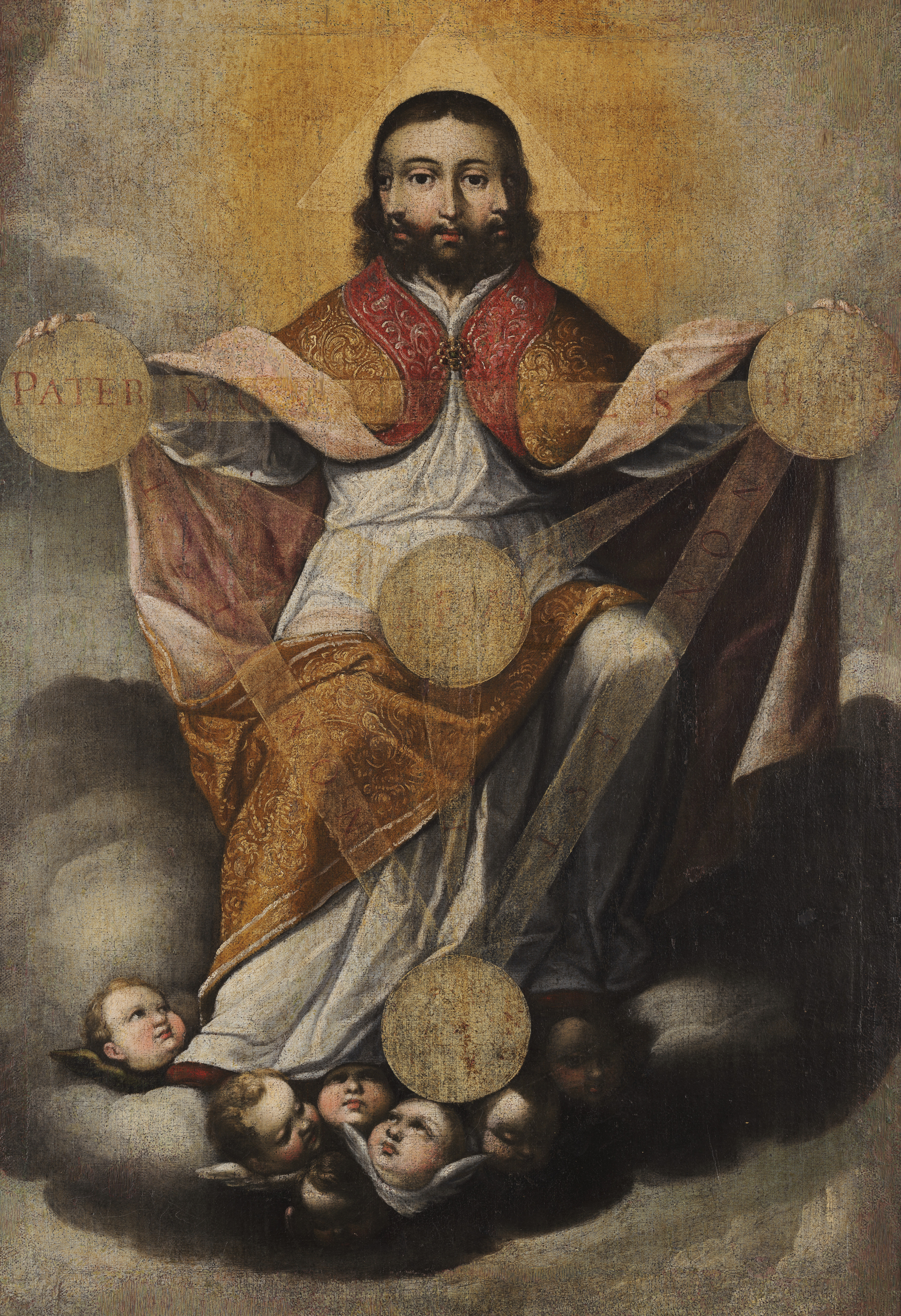
Holy Trinity, by Gregorio Vásquez de Arce y Ceballos. Oil on canvas.62 x 44 cm

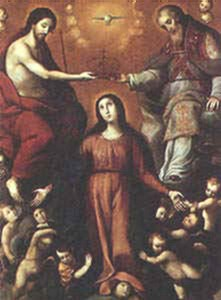
"Coronación de la virgen", by Baltasar Vargas de Figueroa (1663) – The catholic influence is very strong in the colonial period

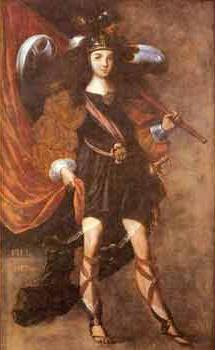
Sopó Archangels, a series of archangels painted around 1650 in colonial Colombia.

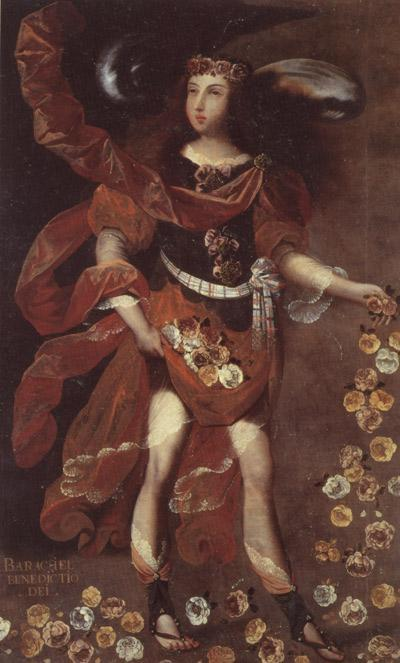
Baraquel- Blessing of God: The archangel of virtue

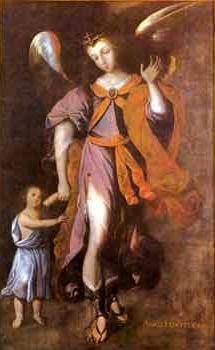
Guardian Angel-Company of God: The angel of children

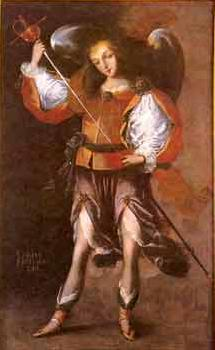
Esriel-Justice of god: The archangel of divine discipline

==== The Virreinato and rococo ====
The raising of the Viceroyalty of New Granada in 1717 coincided roughly with the ascension of the Bourbons to the throne of Spain. This period marked a period of resurgence and the first sparks of Enlightenment in Spain. Rococo, a decadent form, replaced baroque as the dominant style. The new viceroy court in Bogotá led to a surge in demand for portraits of civilians and clergymen. The leading portrait painter of this period was Joaquín Guttiérrez. He depicted members of the aristocracy in frozen forms, surrounded by richly embellished furniture and decoration, and usually printed the subject's name and family title beneath their image.

=== Republican period ===
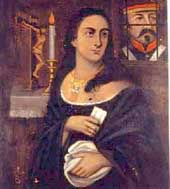
Policarpa Salavarrieta portrait by Mercedes Delgado Mallarino

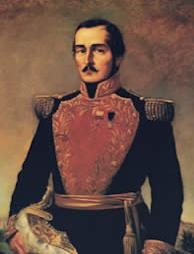
Portrait of Francisco de Paula Santander (1874) by Martín Tovar y Tovar (1827-1902). Oil on canvas

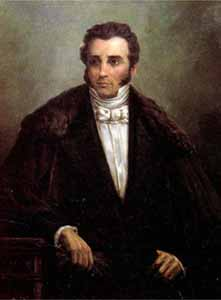
Portrait of Joaquín Mosquera by Ricardo Acevedo Bernal (1867)

=== 20th century and modernism ===
From 1920 to 1940, Marco Tobón Mejía, José Horacio Betancur, Pedro Nel Gómez, Ignacio Gómez Jaramillo, Santiago Martinez Delgado and Alipio Jaramillo produced several mural paintings influenced by the Mexican muralists, with neoclassic features and influences of Art Nouveau. During the 1940s, a rising international disinterest in the Colombian art caused the local artists to try new ways of expression such as Post-Impressionism and French scholar style. An example of this is the landscape painter Ricardo Gómez Campuzano and his depictions of Cartagena.

Several art critics point to the 1950s as the time when Colombian art started to have a distinctive point of view, reinventing the traditional elements under the 20th century concepts. Examples of this are the Greiff portraits by Ignacio Gomez Jaramillo, showing what the Colombian art could do with the new techniques applied to typical Colombian themes. Carlos Correa, with his paradigmatic “Naturaleza muerta en silencio” (silent dead nature), combines geometrical abstraction and cubism in a style still recurrent today in many artists. Pedro Nel Gómez, in his “Autorretrato con sombrero” (1941) (self-portrait with hat) shows influences from Gauguin and Van Gogh. He also shows a strong influence of José Clemente Orozco in his series about the Barequeras (women extracting gold from the rivers banks) and his self-portrait (1949) shows strong influences from Cézanne. Alejandro Obregón is often considered as the father of modern Colombian painting, and one of the most influential artist in this period, due to his originality, the painting of Colombian landscapes with symbolic and expressionist use of animals, (specially the andean condor). In his work is noticeable the influences of Picasso and Graham Sutherland. Currently, some of the most recognized painters in the international scene are Fernando Botero and Omar Rayo.

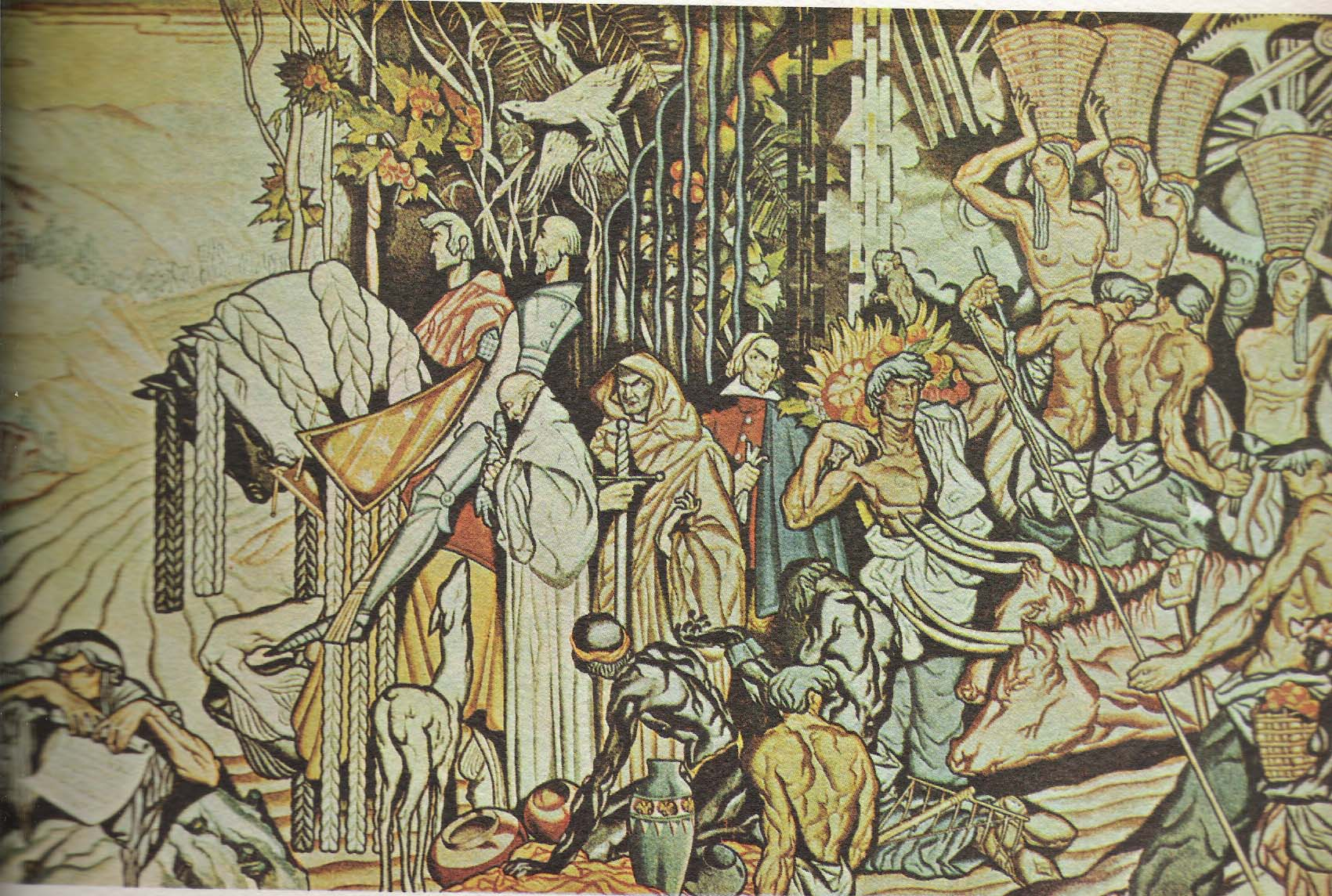
Chicago fair (1933), by Santiago Martinez Delgado

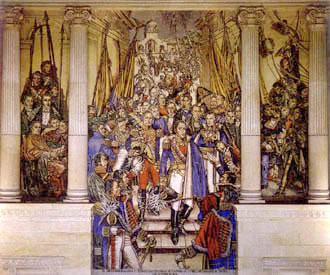
Mural by Santiago Martinez Delgado in the Colombian Congress

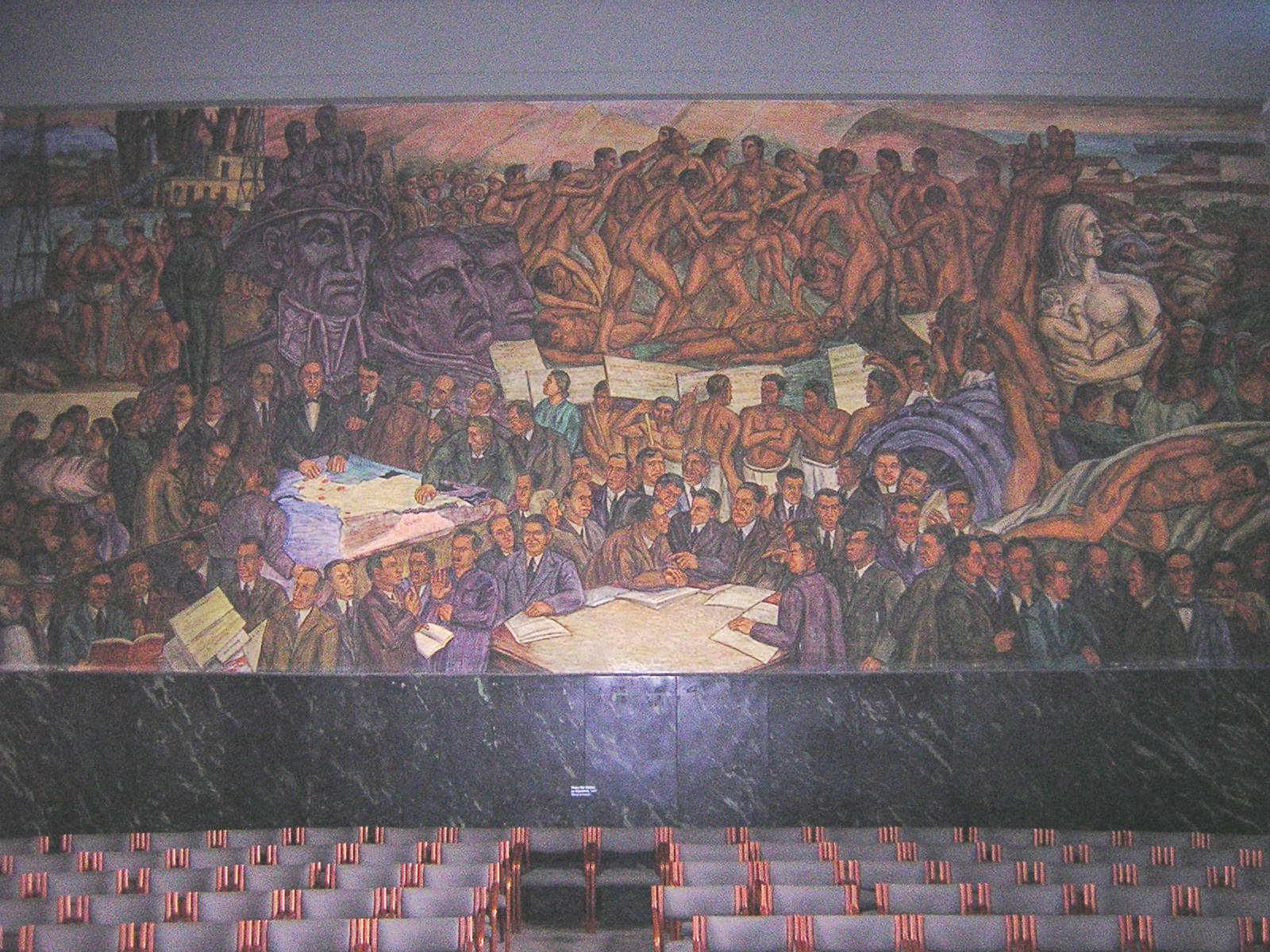
"The Colombian Republic". Mural by Pedro Nel Gómez

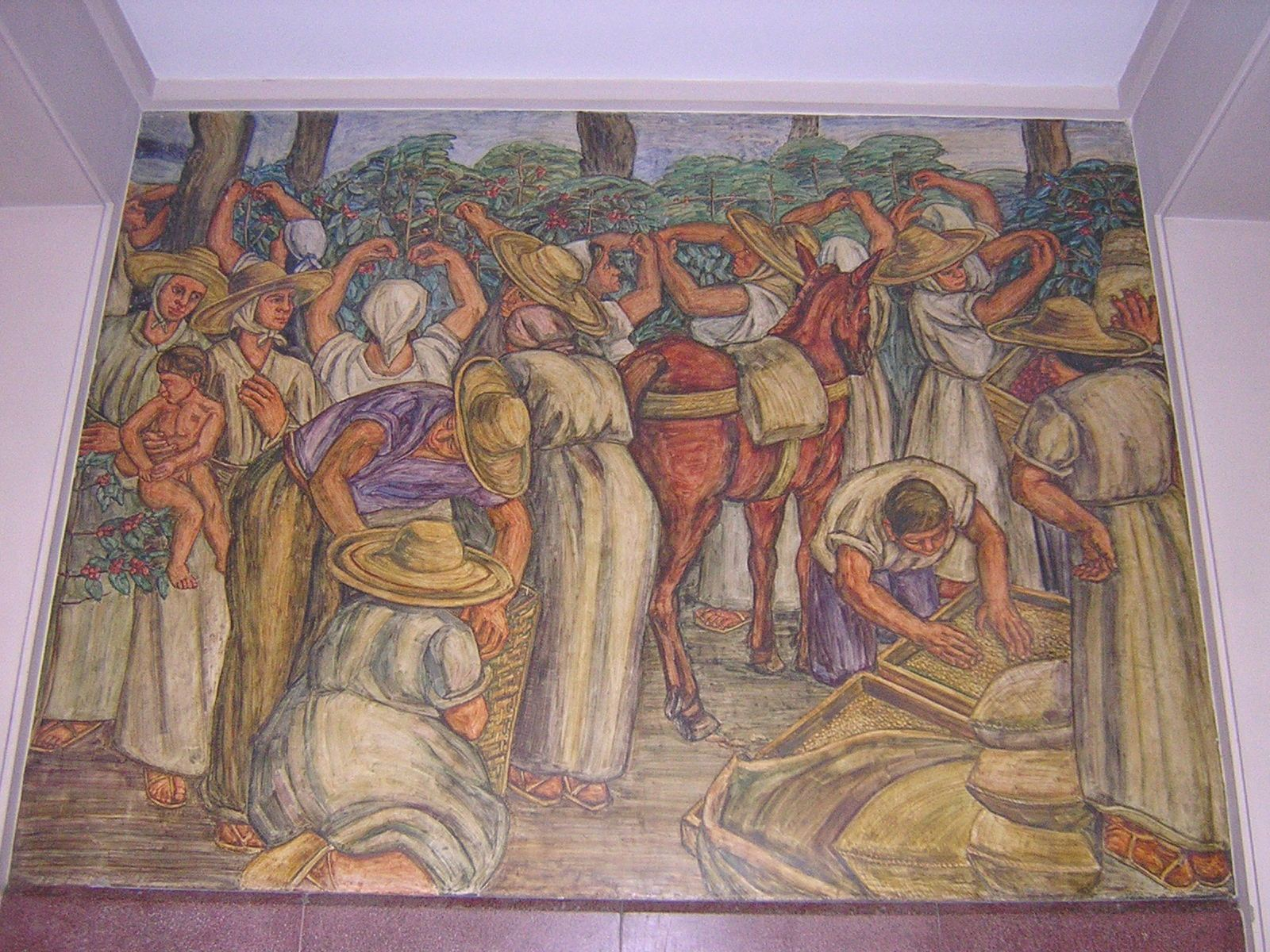
"Coffee dance". Mural by Pedro Nel Gómez

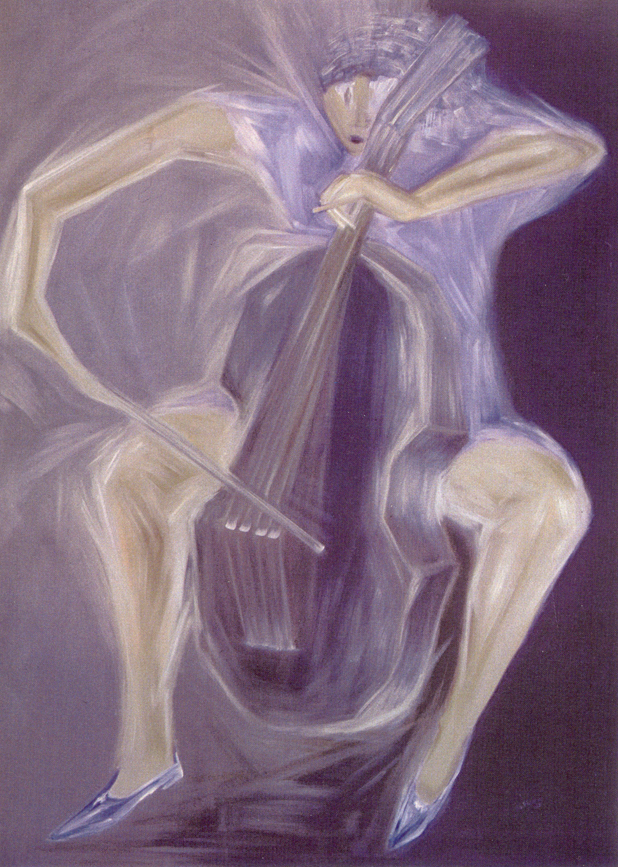
"Painting of a contrabass" by Alvaro Valbuena (1970)

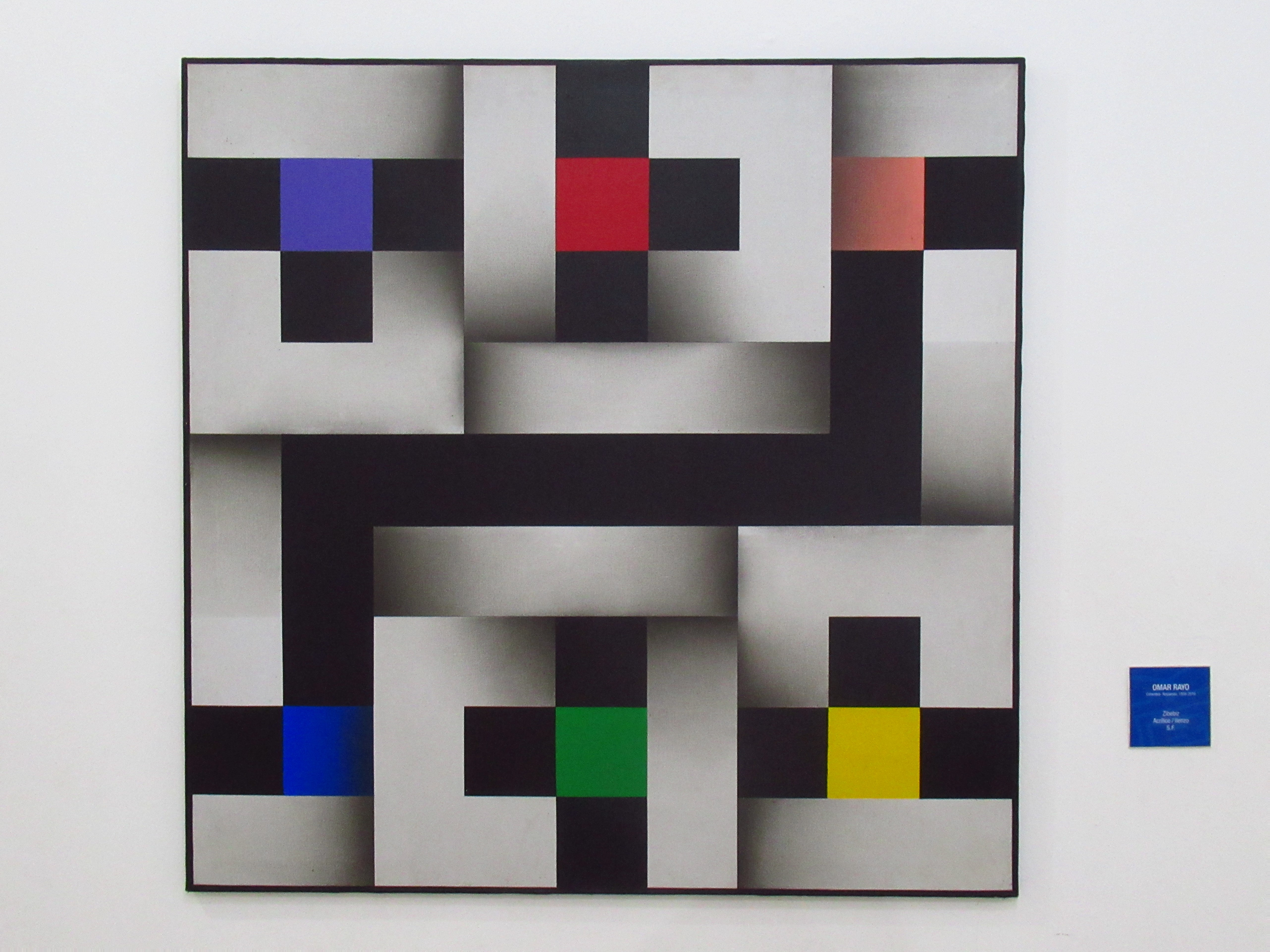
Zibebiz. Omar Rayo. Quinta de San Pedro Alejandrino

=== 21st century ===
During the 21st century, Colombian artists have focused in the intersection between new media and traditional crafts, as well as narratives that reflect on the Colombian conflict and the consequences it has had on Colombian society, territory and bodies.

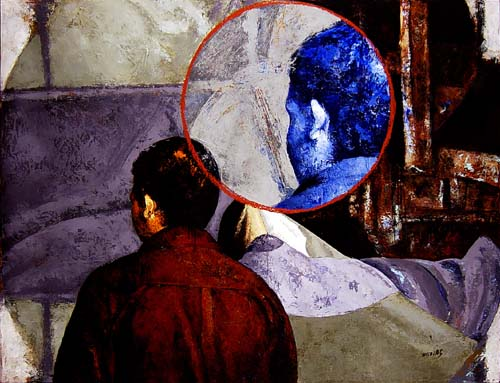
"Fourth Circle" by Nicolas De la Hoz, oil and acrylic on canvas, 2005

== Theater ==
Theater was introduced in Colombia during the Spanish colonization in 1550 through zarzuela companies. Colombian theater is supported by the Ministry of Culture and a number of private and state owned organizations. Among the most important organizations are the National Association of Scenic Directors (ANDE), Performing Arts Workers Associations, Antioquia Storytellers Association, Colombian Association of Critique and Theater Research (ACIT), Puppeteers Associations (ATICO), Colombian Corporation of Theater among others.

Colombian theater was introduced during the colonization by the Spanish between 1550 and 1810. At the end of the 19th century and beginnings of the 20th century the most important center of theater in Colombia was the Colon theater in downtown Bogota. These theaters were built resembling Italian architecture style. During the 20th century interest for theater had spread all over Colombia and many theater were built in the biggest cities of Colombia. Colombia currently holds one of the biggest theater festivals in the world, properly called the Ibero-American Theater Festival. As in many other parts of the world, future actors and actresses begin their performing experience in theater many of them with the goal of making it to television or film. Theater in Colombia is informally known as "tablas" (woods) because of the wooden stages on which actors perform their plays. Colombia has a mature system of theater companies which reaches an audience mostly in the city of Bogota.

== See also ==
- Muisca art
- Colombian handicrafts
- List of Colombian artists
- Culture of Colombia
- Colombian architecture
- Latin American culture
- Art Galleries in Colombia
