= La Chiquinquirá Church =

La Chiquinquirá Church may refer to several churches in Venezuela and Colombia:

- La Chiquinquirá Church (Caracas)
- La Chiquinquirá Church (Maracaibo)
