= Valbuena =

Valbuena (Spanish pronunciation: [balˈβwena]) is a Spanish surname. Notable people with the surname include:

- Acacio Valbuena Rodríguez (1922–2011), Spanish Catholic priest
- Ángel Valbuena Prat (1900–1977), Spanish philologist and historian
- Álvaro Valbuena (born 1941), Colombian artist
- Camila Valbuena (born 1997), Colombian cyclist
- Carmen Valbuena (born 1955), Chilean painter, engraver and curator
- Gilberto Valbuena Sánchez (1929–2021), Mexican Roman Catholic prelate
- Jesús Valbuena (born 1969), Venezuelan footballer
- José Agustín Valbuena Jáuregui (1927–2024), Colombian Roman Catholic prelate
- José Antonio Valbuena Alonso (born 1973), Spanish politician
- José Luis Valbuena (born 1971), Venezuelan boxer
- Luis Valbuena (1985–2018), Venezuelan baseball player
- Luis Valbuena (gymnast) (born 1936), Spanish gymnast
- Mathieu Valbuena (born 1984), French footballer
- Raúl Valbuena (born 1975), Spanish footballer

== See also ==
- Valbuena Abbey, Cistercian monastery in Spain
- Valbuena de Duero, municipality in Castile and León, Spain
- Valbuena de Pisuerga, municipality in Castile and León, Spain
