= La Chiquinquirá Church (Caracas) =

Church in Caracas, Venezuela

Coordinates: 10°30′5.57″N 66°52′38.12″W

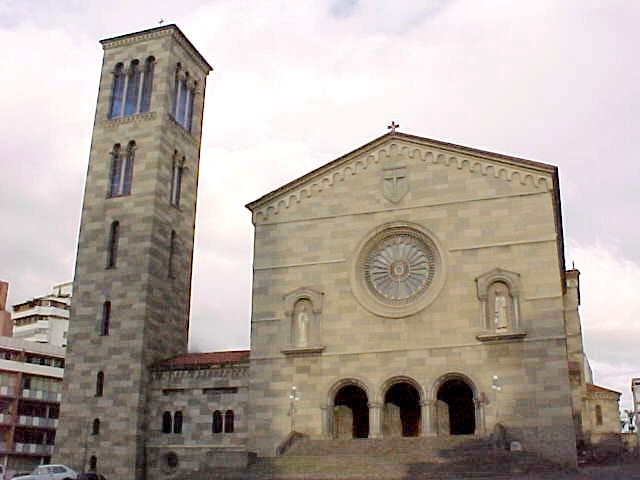
Iglesia de La Chiquinquira 2000 000.jpg

La Chiquinquirá Church (Spanish: Iglesia La Chiquinquirá) is a church in Caracas, Venezuela. La Chiquinquirá Church is the largest Catholic church in Caracas, located in a fortress-like building with a high tower. The church contains some notable statues and paintings. The church is dedicated to Our Lady of the Rosary of Chiquinquirá.
