= Alonso de Narváez =

Colonial Spanish painter

- Born: Alonso de Narváez; Siglo XVI; Alcalá de Guadaíra
- Died: 1583; Tunja, New Kingdom of Granada
- Spouse: Ana de Prado
- Children: 10

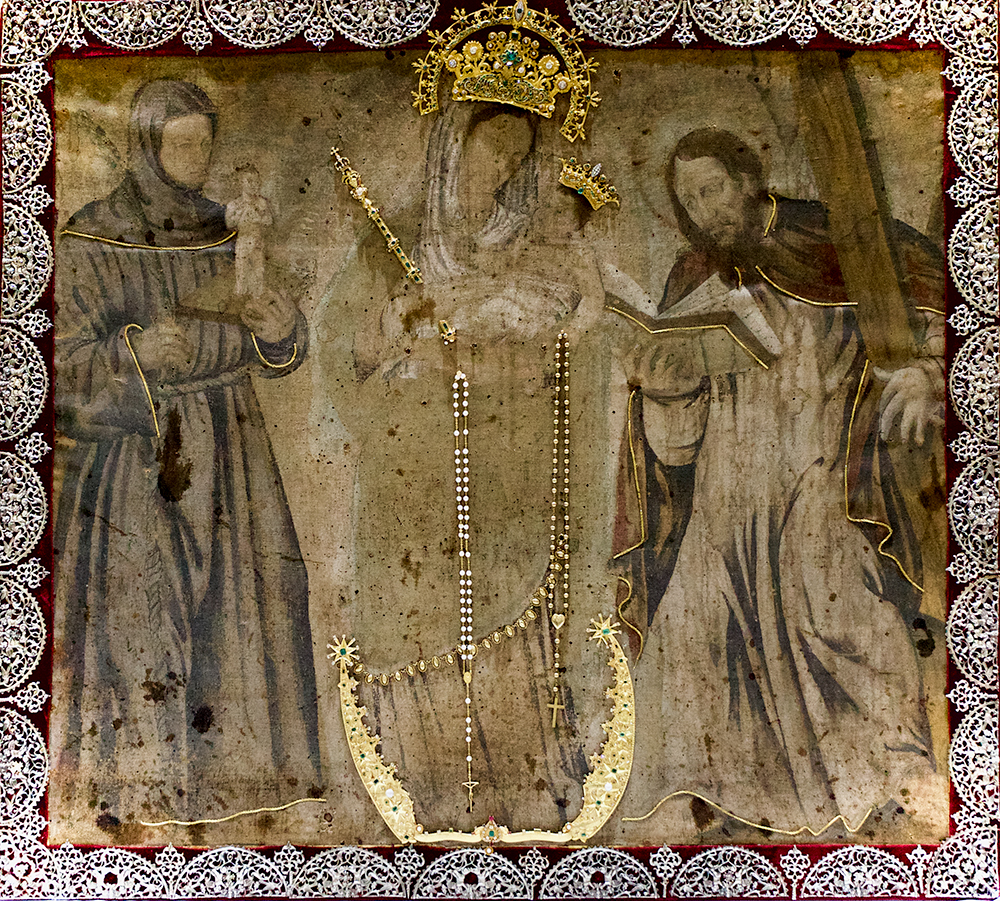
Painting of the Virgin of Chiquinquirá by Alonso de Narváez

Alonso de Narváez (died 1583) was a Spanish colonial painter. He is famous for painting an image of the Virgin of Chiquinquirá, which became a venerated image and is housed at the Basilica of Our Lady of the Rosary of Chiquinquirá in Colombia.

== Biography ==
He was born in Alcalá de Guadaíra, Spain, to Hernando de Alma and Mencía de Narváez. He later moved to the Kingdom of New Granada.

He married Ana de Prado and had ten children.

He signed his will on October 12, 1583 and died in Tunja.

== Painting of the Virgin of Chiquinquirá ==
Narváez painted the image in 1562 on a cotton canvas. To create the image, Narvaez used pigments from the soil, herbs and flowers of the region. On either side of the Virgin Mary are St. Anthony of Padua and St. Andrew the Apostle, Don Antonio de Santana, and monk, Andrés Jadraque, who commissioned the painting.
