= Carmen Piemonte =

Chilean painter, educator and professor (1930–2024)

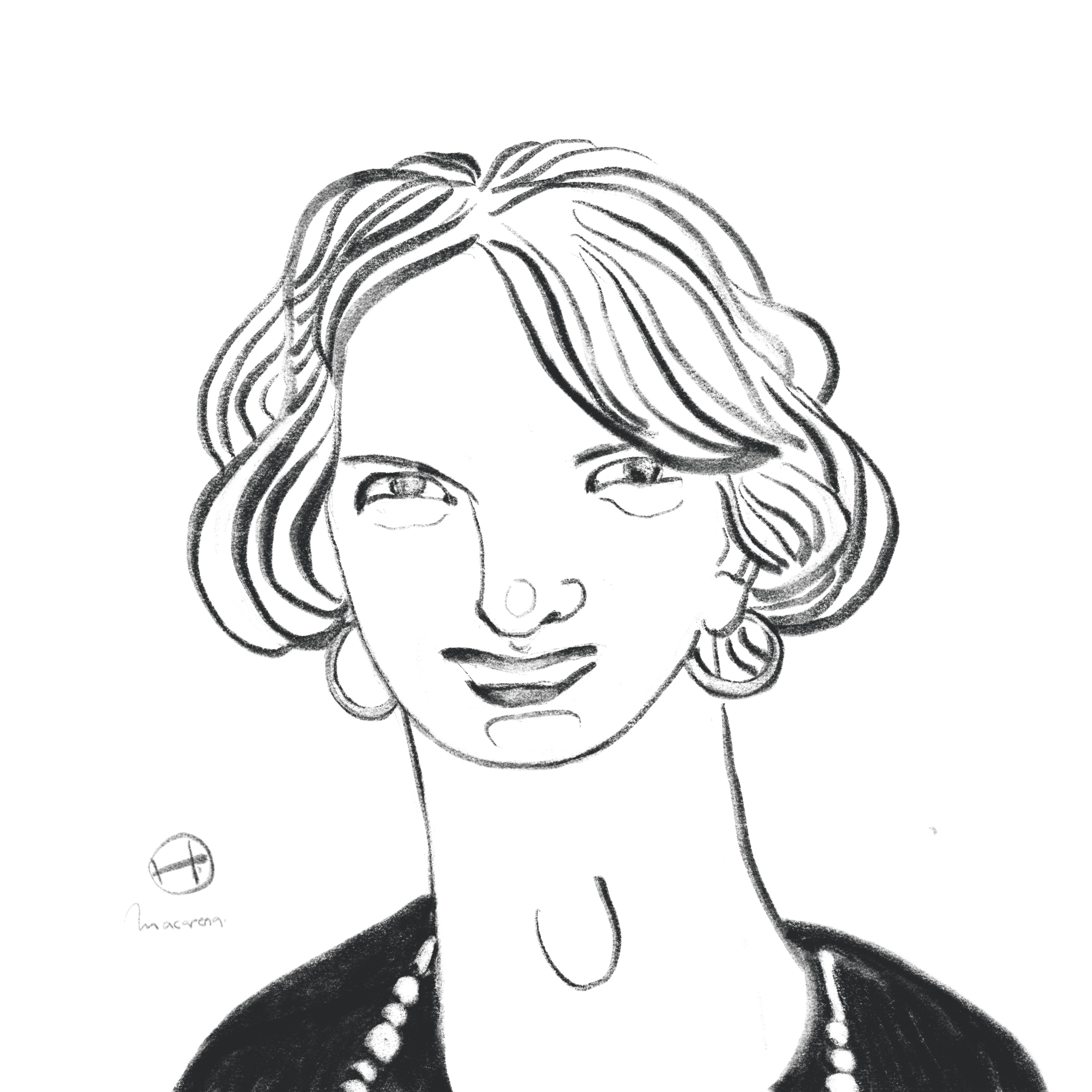
- Macarena Olivera Hardoy (2021) Retrato de la Artista Chilena Carmen Piemonte
- Born: Carmen Piemonte Miani; 28 October 1930; Buja, Kingdom of Italy
- Died: 11 December 2024 (aged 94); Chile
- Education: University of Chile; Accademia di Belle Arti di Roma, 1972
- Occupations: Painter; educator; professor
- Children: Carmen Valbuena

Carmen Piemonte Miani (28 October 1930 – 11 December 2024) was an Italian-born Chilean painter, educator and professor.

== Early life and education ==
Piemonte was born on 28 October 1930 (Note: Also cited as 1932.) in Buja, Kingdom of Italy (present-day, Italy). Piemonte studied fine art at the University of Chile, where she was a student and assistant to Ramón Vergara Grez. In 1955, Piemonte obtained her degree in visual arts education.

== Career ==
During 1959 to 1970, Piemonte taught at various schools in Santiago. From 1965 to 1970, Piemonte worked at the University of Chile as an assistant professor in drawing. During 1970 to 1974, Piemonte taught a course in shape and color.

In 1965 (Note: Also cited as 1969.), Piemonte joined the Form and Space Movement (Spanish: Movimiento Forma y Espacio).

In 1971, Piemonte was awarded scholarship by the Italian government to attend the Accademia di Belle Arti di Roma. From 1971 to 1972, Piemonte studied under Franco Gentilini.

== Personal life ==
Piemonte was the mother of the painter and engraver Carmen Valbuena.

On 11 December 2024 Piemonte died in Chile, aged 94.
