= Carmen Valbuena =

Chilean painter, engraver and curator (born 1955)

- Born: Carmen Valbuena Piemonte; 28 September 1955 (age 71); Santiago, Chile
- Education: University of Concepción, 1974; Pontifical Catholic University of Chile, 2003
- Occupations: Painter; engraver; curator
- Mother: Carmen Piemonte
- Website: carmenvalbuena.cl

Carmen Valbuena Piemonte (born 28 September 1955) is a Chilean painter, engraver and curator. Valbuena is a representative of the Chilean Generation of '80 (Spanish: Generación del 80).

== Life and career ==
Valbuena was born on 28 September 1955 in Santiago to Carmen Piemonte, an Italian-born Chilean painter, educator and professor. Valbuena holds duel Chilean and Italian citizenship.

In 1974, graduated with a Bachelor's in painting from the University of Concepción. In 1976, Valbuena relocated to Panama where she studied drawing and ceramic sculpture at the Art Center of the Ministry of Education of Panama. Valbuena later took courses in introductory architecture at the University of Panama between 1977 and 1978.

In 1983, Valbuena joined the drawing and painting workshop at the Foro de Arte Contemporáneo (Spanish: Contemporary Art Forum) in Mexico City. Returning to Chile in 1990, Valbuena joined Workshop 99 (Spanish: Taller 99).

In 2003, Valbuena graduated from the Pontifical Catholic University of Chile with a diploma in conservation and restoration. Valbuena worked as an art curator for Emilio Ellena from 2005 until his death in 2011.
