= Basilica of Our Lady of Chiquinquirá, Maracaibo =

Church in Maracaibo, Venezuela

Coordinates: 10°38′33″N 71°36′47.75″W

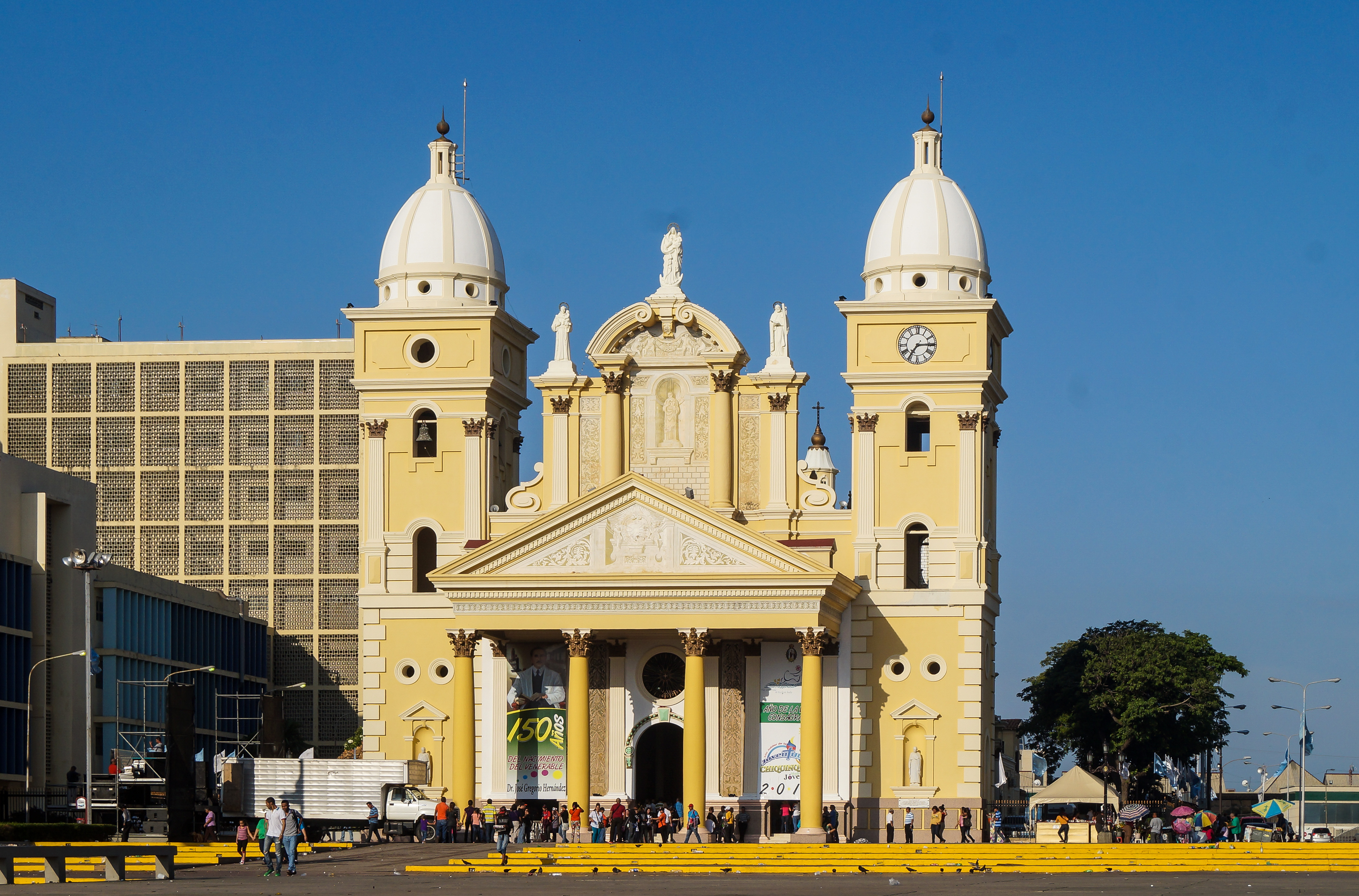
Basílica de la Chinita

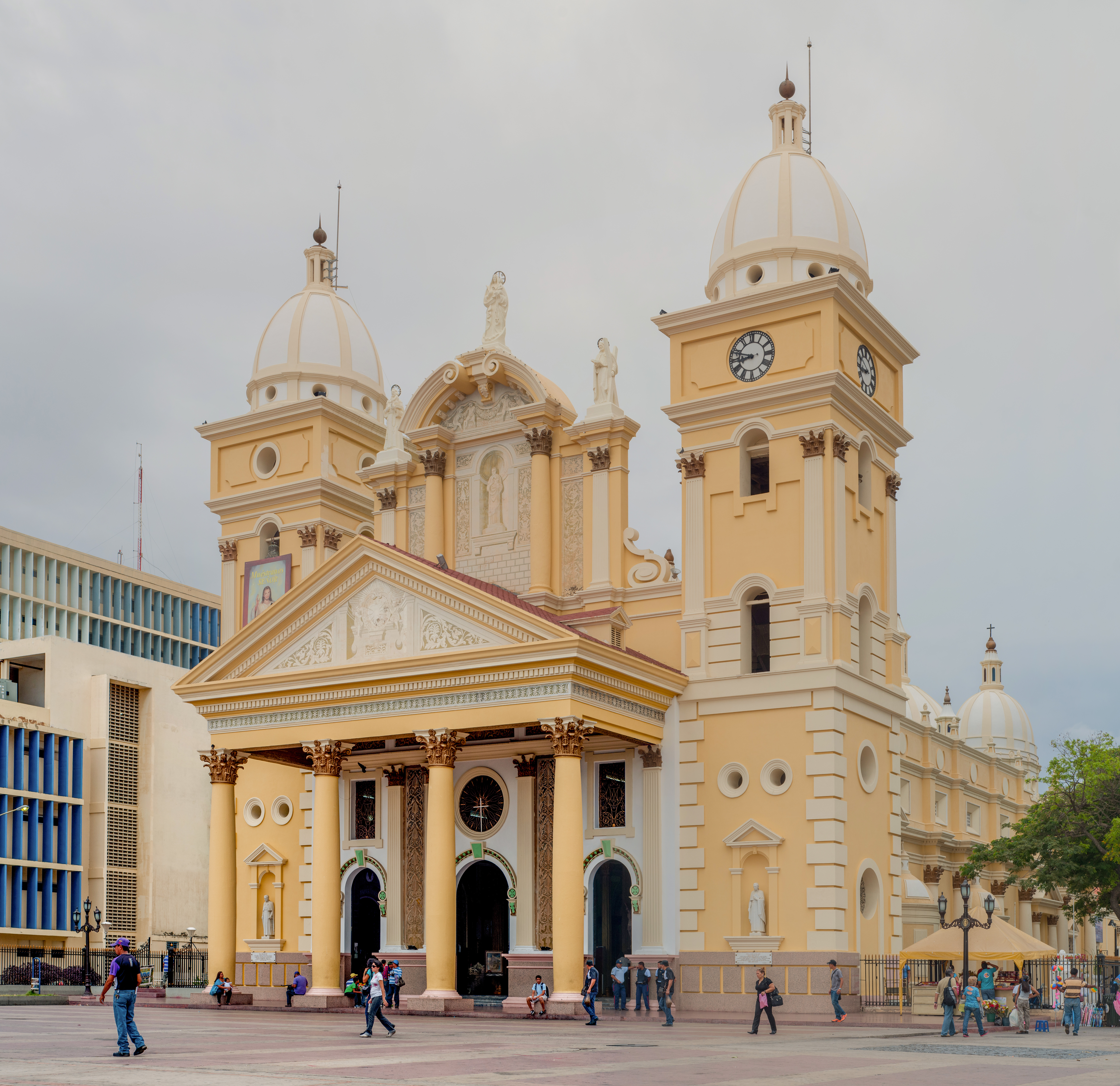
Basilica of Our Lady of Chiquinquirá, Maracaibo

The Basilica of Chiquinquirá in Maracaibo (Spanish: La Basilica Menor de la Virgen de La Chiquinquirá) is a church in Maracaibo, Venezuela. The feast day of the church is November 18. It is a colonial church that was built between 1686 and completed in 1858.

The basilica enshrines a colonial wooden image made in 1709, the second colonial replica of the famed earliest cotton painting of Our Lady of Chiquinquirá.

Pope Benedict XV granted a decree of canonical coronation for the Bishop of Zulia, Arturo Celestino Álvarez on 16 July 1917. The same Pontiff raised her shrine to the status of Minor Basilica via the Pontifical decree Exstat in Civitate on 18 May 1920.

The former Bishop of Zulia, Marcos Sergio Godoy executed the rite of coronation on 18 November 1942, twenty five years after its approval due to delayed preparations, financial crisis and political turmoil.

== See also ==
- Basilica of Our Lady of the Rosary of Chiquinquirá
