= Basilica of Our Lady of the Rosary of Chiquinquirá =

Basilica in Chiquinquirá, Colombia

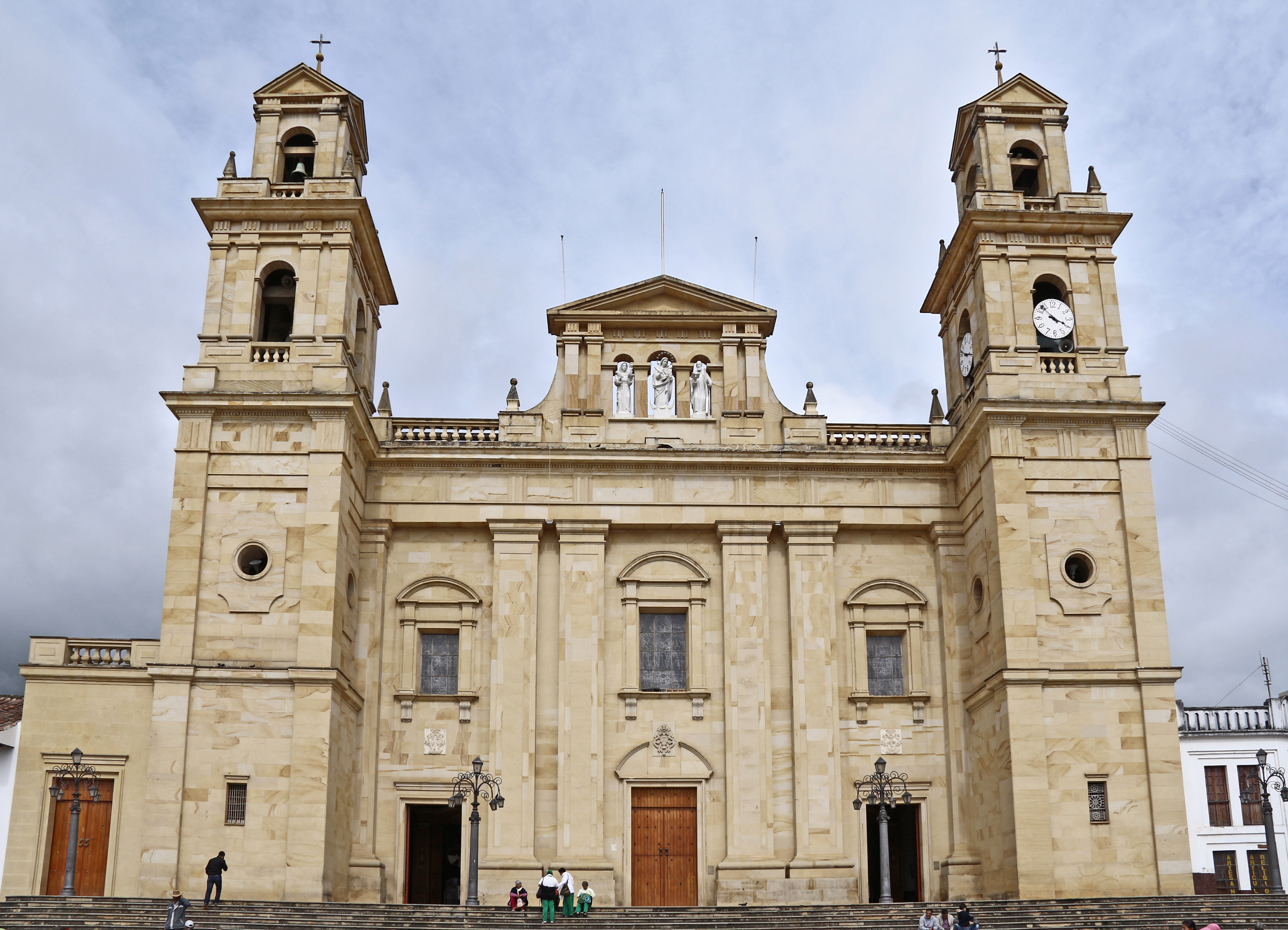
- Basilica of Our Lady of the Rosary of Chiquinquirá
- 5.616860°N 73.814835°W
- Country: Colombia
- Denomination: Catholic
- Website: virgendechiquinquira.com

Architecture
- Architectural type: Neoclassicism

Administration
- Diocese: Roman Catholic Diocese of Chiquinquirá

The Basilica of Our Lady of the Rosary of Chiquinquirá is a minor basilica of Catholic worship located in the Colombian city of Chiquinquirá, in the department of Boyacá. The basilica enshrines the venerated Marian image of the Virgin of Chiquinquirá, which is also a national shrine.

Pope Pius XI raised the shrine to the status of minor basilica via the Pontifical decree Exstat in Colombia on 18 August 1927. Pope John Paul II visited the sanctuary on 3 July 1986.

== History ==
In 1588, the former Archbishop of Santa Fe in New Granada, Luis Zapata de Cárdenas, laid the foundation stone of a church to display the image of the virgin. In the late 1700s a new church was built and was consecrated in 1823.

The church was declared a minor basilica in 1927.

== Gallery ==
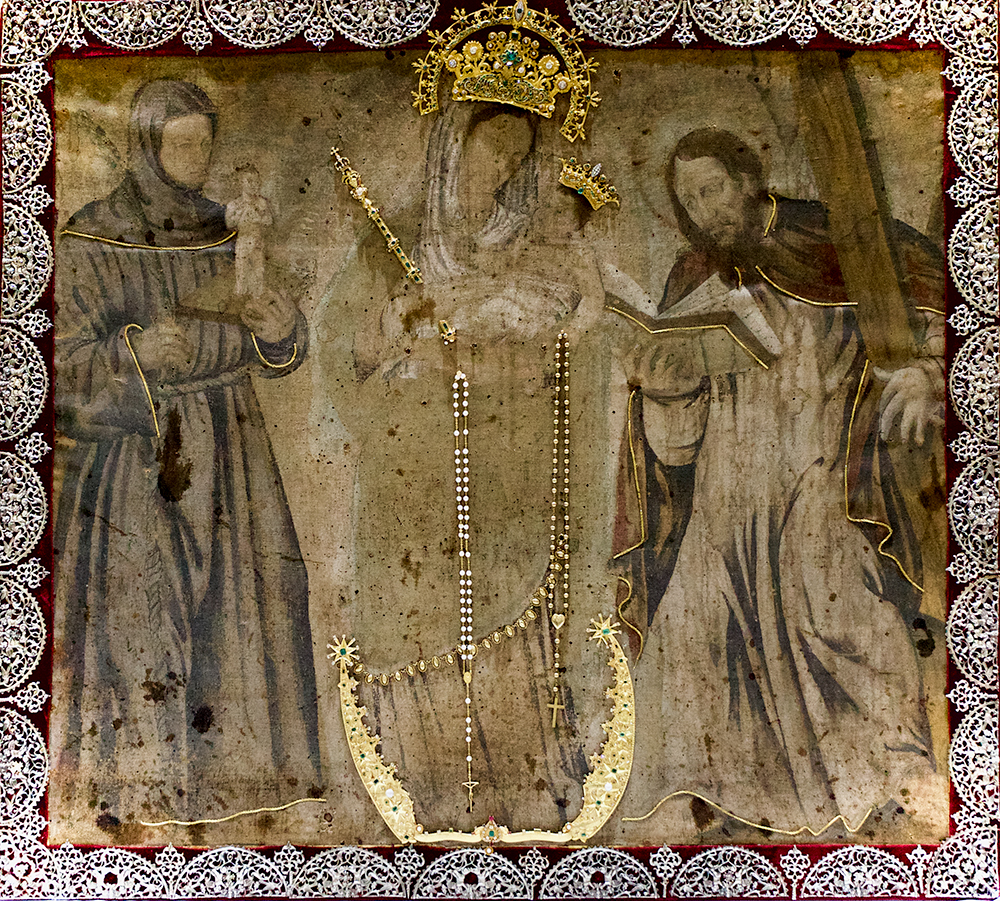
Venerated image of the Virgin of Chiquinquirá

== See also ==
- Basilica of Our Lady of Chiquinquirá, Maracaibo
