= Álvaro Valbuena =

Colombian artist (born 1941)

- Born: January 3, 1941 (age 84); Bucaramanga, Colombia
- Occupation: Artist

Álvaro Valbuena (born 1941 in Bucaramanga, Colombia), is a Colombian artist. He began painting in 1960, and lived and worked in Paris, France, from 1975 until 1984. In 1984 he began his work at the Frans Masserel Centre in Belgium. In 1994, he produced frescoes in Tuscany, Italy.

Valbuena's works can be found in museums, galleries and private collections throughout Europe, North and South America.

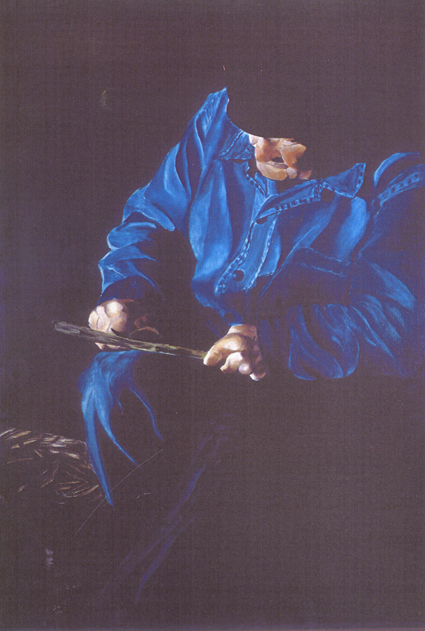
Tallador (oil on cloth) Years 1980

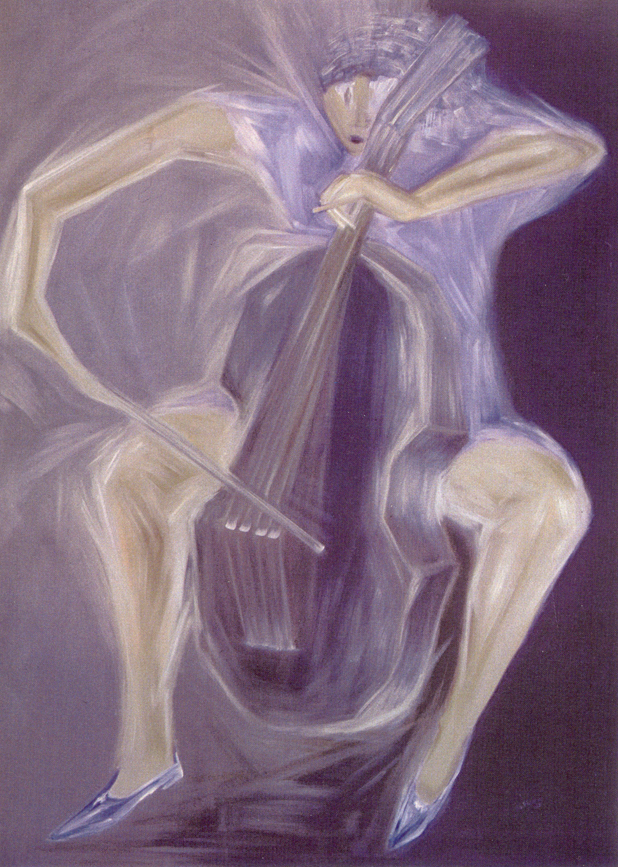
Contrabajo (oil on cloth) Years 70

== Prizes and honours ==
- 1980 Honorable Mention « Colombian-American Binational Centre »(Drawing), Cali, Colombia.
- 1985 First International Prize at the “Karu Tiwanacota” Biennial Arts Contest (Painting), La Paz, Bolivia.
- 1986 Second Prize, Silver Medal, Springtime Exhibition (Drawing), Clichy-La Garenne, France.
- First International Prize, Vermeil Medal with Special Mention, Lutece Academy (Painting), Paris.
- 1989 Honorable Mention « Prince Pierre de Monaco Foundation»,(Dessin), Monte Carlo.
- 1994 Purchase by the Santa Margherita's Basilica Sanctuary, Cortona, Italy.
- 1995 Rotary Club First International Prize (Drawing), Saint-Cloud, France.
