= Our Lady of the Rosary of Chiquinquirá =

Patron saint and venerated icon

Our Lady of the Holy Rosary of Chiquinquirá
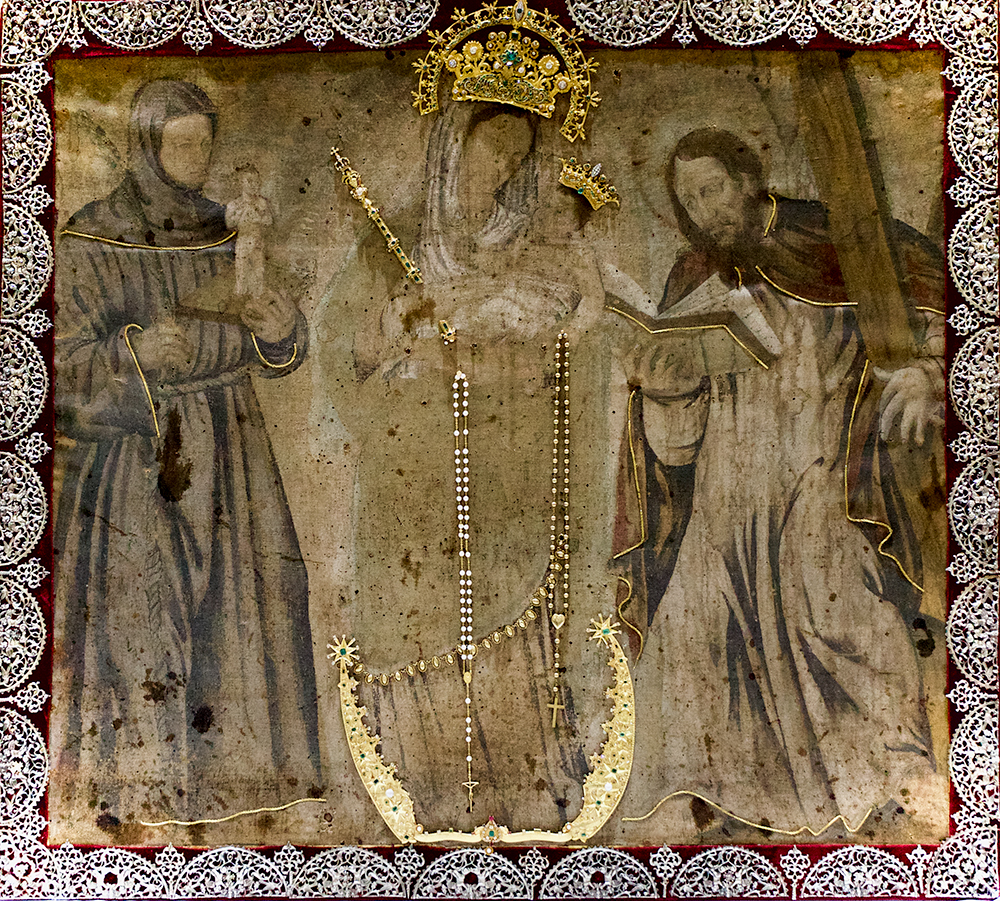
- The Colombian image made in 1562

Patroness of Colombia
- Venerated in: Roman Catholic Church
- Major shrine: Basilica of Our Lady of the Rosary of Chiquinquirá, Colombia
- Feast: 9 July
- Attributes: the Blessed Virgin Mary standing on a crescent moon, with a blue cloak and white veil, holding the Child Jesus, with a bird, rosary and scepter, accompanied by Saint Anthony of Padua and Saint Andrew the Apostle
- Patronage: Colombia

Our Lady of the Holy Rosary of Chiquinquirá (Spanish: Nuestra Señora del Santissimo Rosario de Chiquinquirá), or the Virgin of Chiquinquirá (Spanish: Virgen de Chiquinquirá), is a Marian title of the Blessed Virgin Mary associated with a venerated image in the northern Andes region and is the patroness saint of Colombia. The original painting of this image was made by the Spaniard Alonso de Narváe on cotton support in 1562.

Pope Pius X on 9 January 1910 authorised the Canonical Coronation of the image but was not carried out until 9 July 1919 due to the political turmoil prevalent at the time. Pope Pius XI raised her sanctuary to the status of minor basilica via the Pontifical decree Exstat in Colombia on 18 August 1927. Pope John Paul II visited the sanctuary on 3 July 1986.

In August 2020, the Government of Colombia was approved to donate a Marian image of the same namesake in the Vatican Gardens at the 18th slot.

== Colombia ==
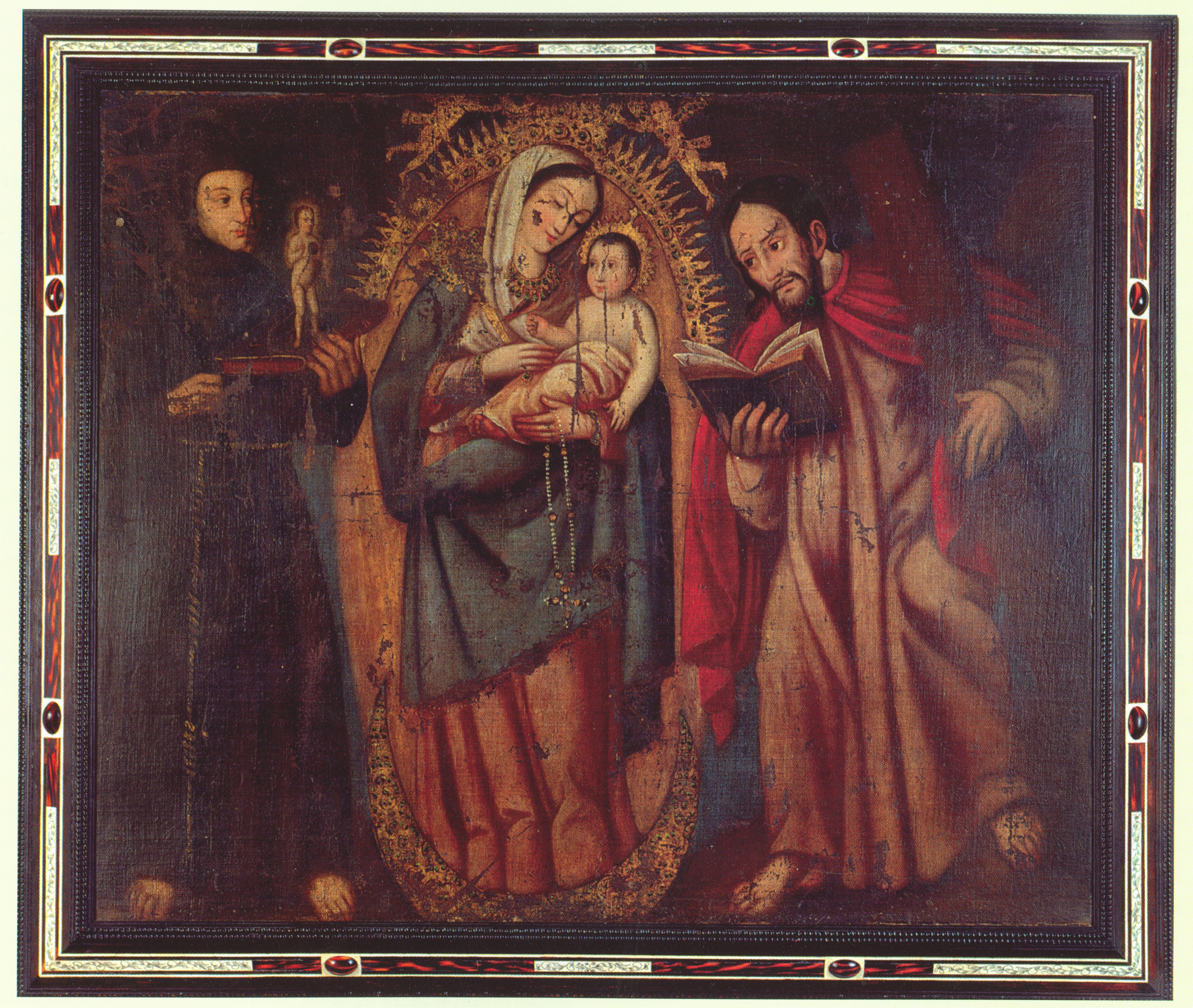
Painting of the Virgin of Chiquinquirá, made in 1660 by Baltasar Vargas de Figueroa. Colección de Arte del Banco de la República, Bogotá.

Pursuant to a commission received from Antonio de Santana, who had received in 1560 an encomienda of the Indians of Suta, a Spanish painter named Alonso de Narváez painted a portrait of the Virgin of the Rosary on a homespun piece of cotton woven by the Indians. Painting in tempera, he used mineral pigments from the soil and organic juices from local herbs and flowers.

In 1562, the portrait was placed in a chapel with a roof that leaked, and in time the humidity, air, and sun had damaged the painting, leaving the subject unrecognisable. In 1577, the worn painting was moved to Chiquinquirá and left abandoned in a room that had formerly been a family oratory. Eight years later, María Ramos, a pious Spaniard from Seville, refurbished the modest chapel and enshrined the faded painting in it. Tradition has it that the miraculous restoration of the painting occurred on Friday, 26 December 1586: scratches and holes in the cotton were gradually sealed, with light and colour overlaying them. The image stood out again, having recovered its vivacity and brightness.

The Virgin of the Rosary in the center of the painting is approximately three feet high. She looks towards her left as if to call attention to the nearly naked Christ Child in her arms. She has a calm countenance with a delicate smile. Both her face and the Child's are pale. The Child has a small, brightly coloured bird tied to his thumb, and a rosary hangs from his left hand. A white veil covers her hair, and her rose-tinted robe is covered by a sky-blue cape. The Virgin stands on a crescent moon, suggesting she is the Woman of the Apocalypse. With the little finger of her left hand, she holds a rosary which hangs in front of her, and in her right hand is a scepter. On her right stands the figure of Saint Anthony of Padua, in the Franciscan habit and holding his usual a book with a vision of the Child Jesus atop, and on her left is the Apostle Saint Andrew, carrying his X-shaped cross. These were the patron saints respectively of Antonio de Santana, the Spanish colonist who had commissioned the painting, and the Dominican friar, Andrés Jadaque, who had arranged for De Narváez to paint it.

The figures appear blurred up close, but seem clearer when viewed from a distance. The painting has markedly deteriorated through various causes which were assessed by Cecilia Álvarez White during a technical examination of the painting in 1986. These include the lack of any prepared ground to size the cotton support, the method of painting, and the nature of the pigments used which tend to degrade after exposure to light and humidity. Álvarez White concluded that the single greatest cause of pictorial degradation occurred over the 50 years preceding her examination, when the painting was exposed to more or less continuous, intense electric light. In addition, for three hundred years the image of Our Lady of the Rosary of Chiquinquirá was exposed to the faithful without any protection, permitting thousands to touch the flimsy cloth. Since 1897, a thick glass cover has protected the painting from inclement weather and the excessive touch of devotees.

== Venezuela ==
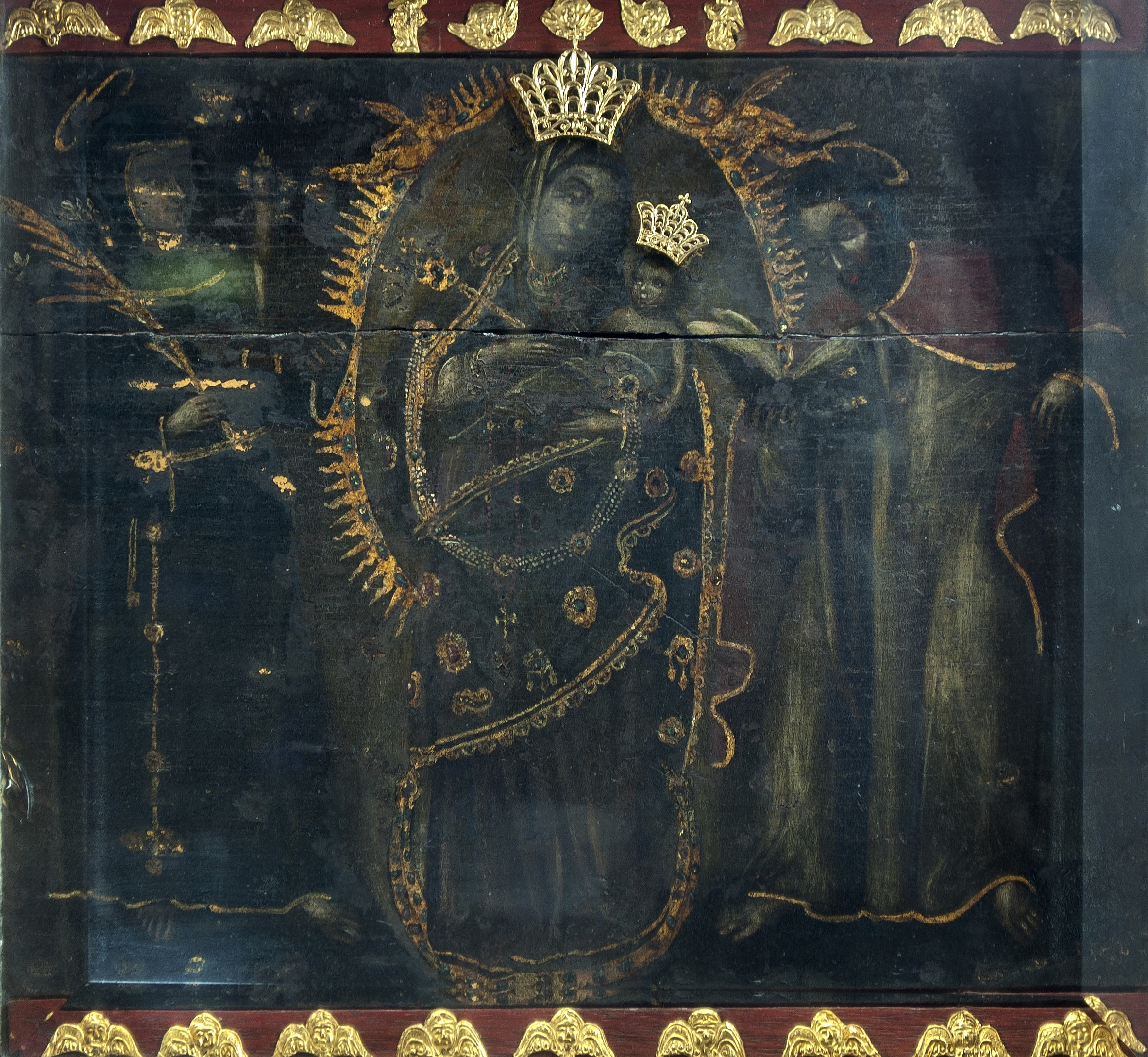
The Venezuelan colonial image of the Virgin of Chiquinquirá housed in the Basilica of Our Lady of Chiquinquirá, Maracaibo, Venezuela

=== Story of the prodigy ===
Legend has it that the government decided the image belonged in the capital city, Caracas, so they ordered it moved. As soldiers were to take the image away, it grew heavier and heavier until no man could lift it. The soldiers promptly returned it to the Basilica, where it has remained since.

=== Wooden tablet, crown, and square ===
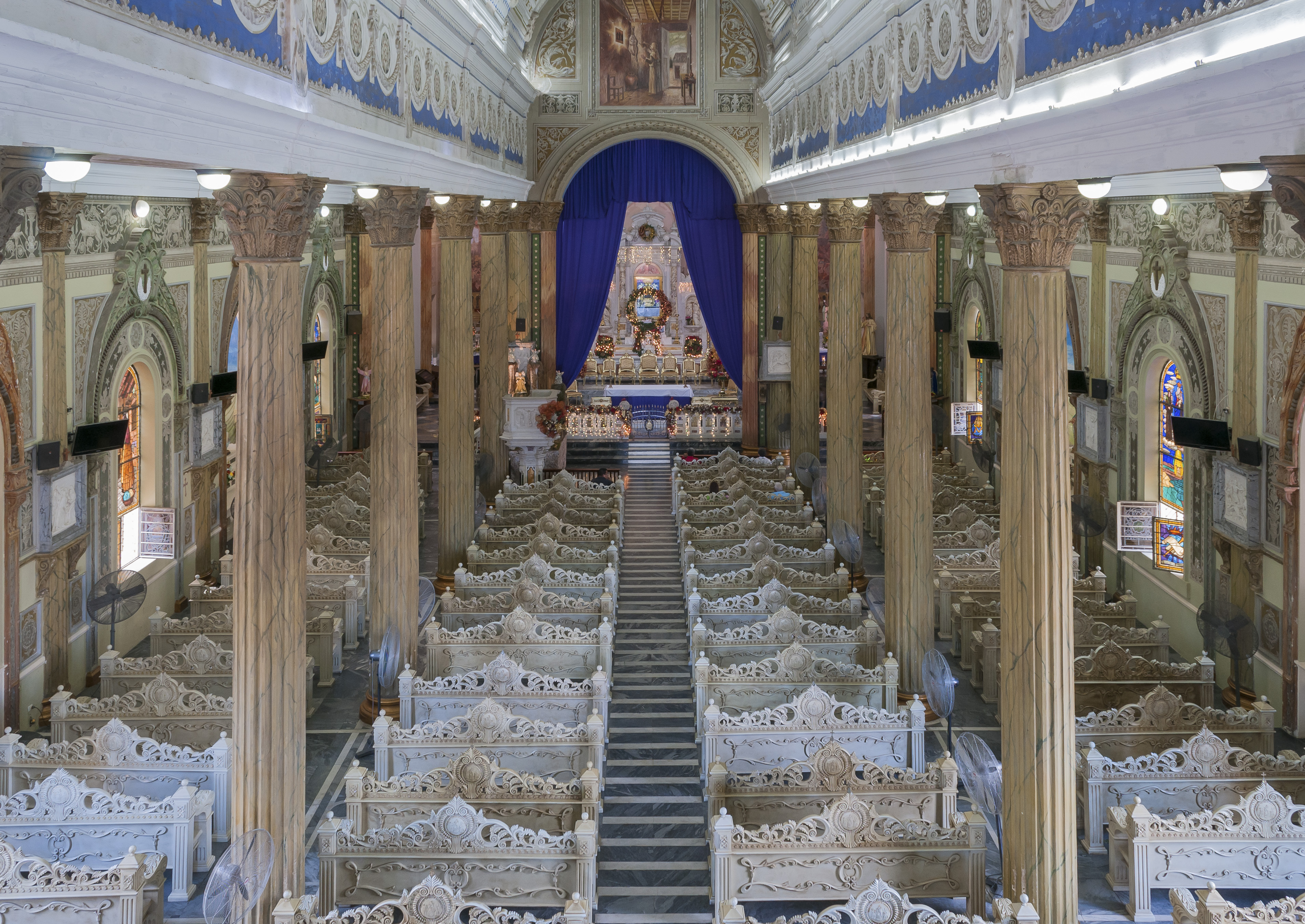
Interior view of the Basilica of Our Lady of Chiquinquirá, Maracaibo, in Venezuela

The tablet depicting the image of the Virgin Mary was first taken to a small sanctuary built to honor San Juan de Dios and later, under the rule of the governor Francisco de la Roche Ferrer, a bigger chapel was erected to venerate the newly found image of the Virgin of Chiquinquirá. The tablet remained there until the final stage of the Basilica, the basilica was completed in 1858.

The tablet is relatively small. The dimensions are: 26 centimeters wide by 25 centimeters long and 3 millimeters deep. The Virgin Mary holds the baby Jesus in her left arm. To her left is the Apostle Saint Andrew holding an open book, and to her right Saint Anthony holding a lily (a symbol of chastity) in his right hand. The tablet was restored and preserved, and embellished with 18-carat gold engraving to magnify its beauty.

The crown suspended above the tablet weighs 10 kilograms and it was made of 18-carat gold, donated by the public. Its inner arch measures 27 centimeters by 44 centimeters and a number of precious stones were embedded. It is one of the most highly prized relics in all of Zulia. By the time the crown was made it cost around 250 thousand bolívars.

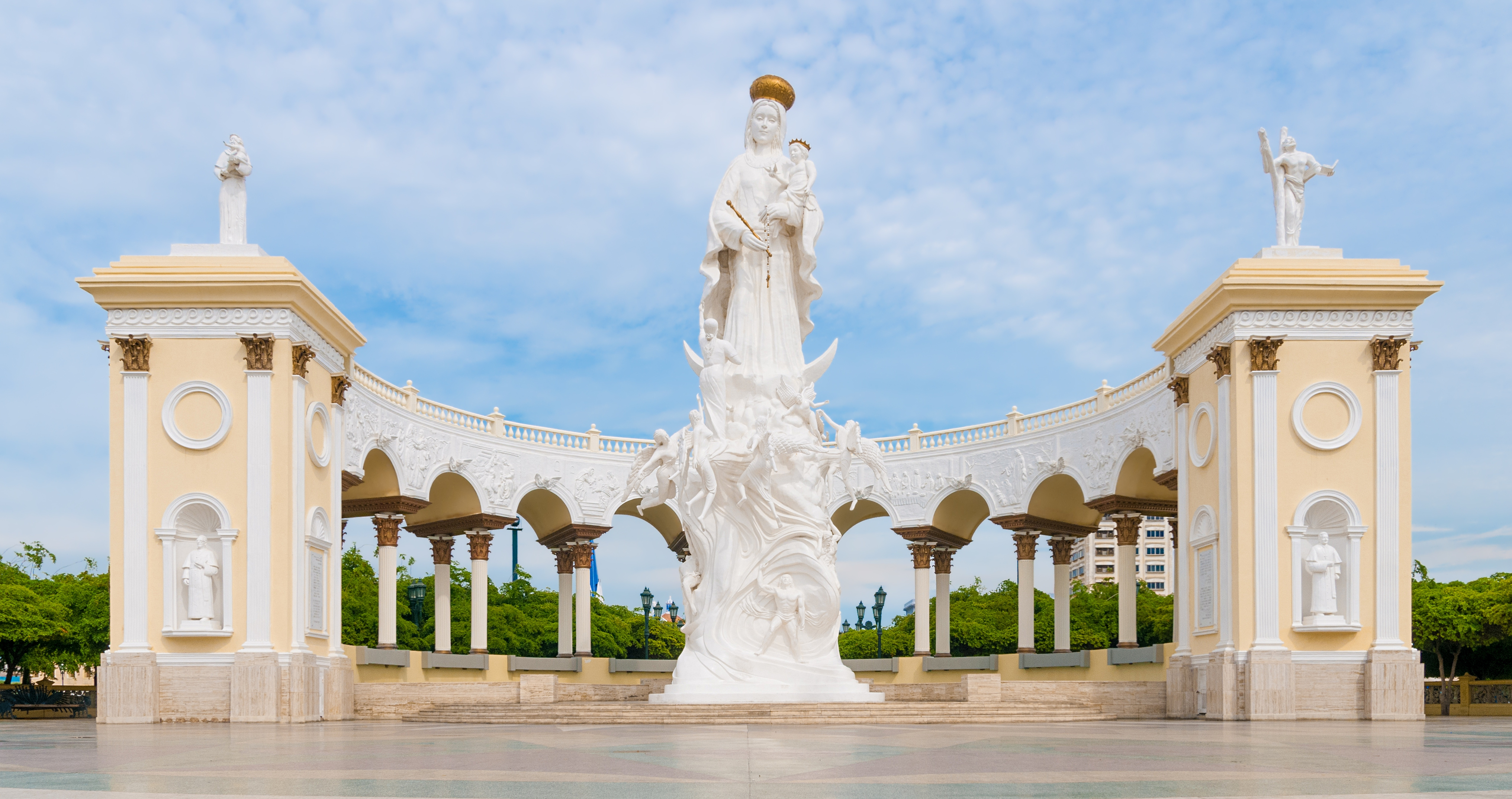
Monument of Our Lady of the Rosary of Chiquinquirá, Paseo Ciencias, Maracaibo, Venezuela

In the year 2004, the local government inaugurated the "Square of Our Lady of the Rosary of Chiquinquirá", an open sanctuary reminiscent of the old times. The great monument of the Virgin of Chiquinquirá is located exactly where the washer woman's house once was. The total area of the square is 30,000 square meters (320,000 sq ft) whose epicenter is a 15-meter-high allegorical statue of the Virgin Mary. There are also three mirror-like fountains as well as a smaller square devoted to Saint Sebastian, the patron saint of Maracaibo.

Other cultural activities are held during the fair. Expo-Zulia is a temporary marketplace where the Zulians show numerous products that characterize the state. Many merchants, stores, companies and artisans offer their products at reasonably low prices. Bullfights are popular, with a number held in the local bullring. The "Toros coleados" finds many "gaiteros" in front of the basilica singing their best gaitas in honor of Our Lady, keeping alive a long-standing tradition of folk music.

The celebrations mark the first salvo of a long Christmas season within Venezuela.

== Pontifical approbations ==
- Pope Pius VII declared her Patroness of Colombia in 1829, with a proper liturgical feast.
- Pope Pius X granted the image a decree of Canonical coronation on 9 January 1910. The rite of coronation was executed on 9 July 1919 due to delayed preparations and political climate in the country.
- Pope Pius XI raised her sanctuary to the status of minor basilica via the Pontifical decree Exstat in Colombia on 18 August 1927.
- Pope John Paul II visited and prayed at her shrine on 3 July 1986.

The feast day of Our Lady of the Rosary of Chiquinquira, Patroness of Colombia is July 9, her actual day of coronation.

== Veneration ==
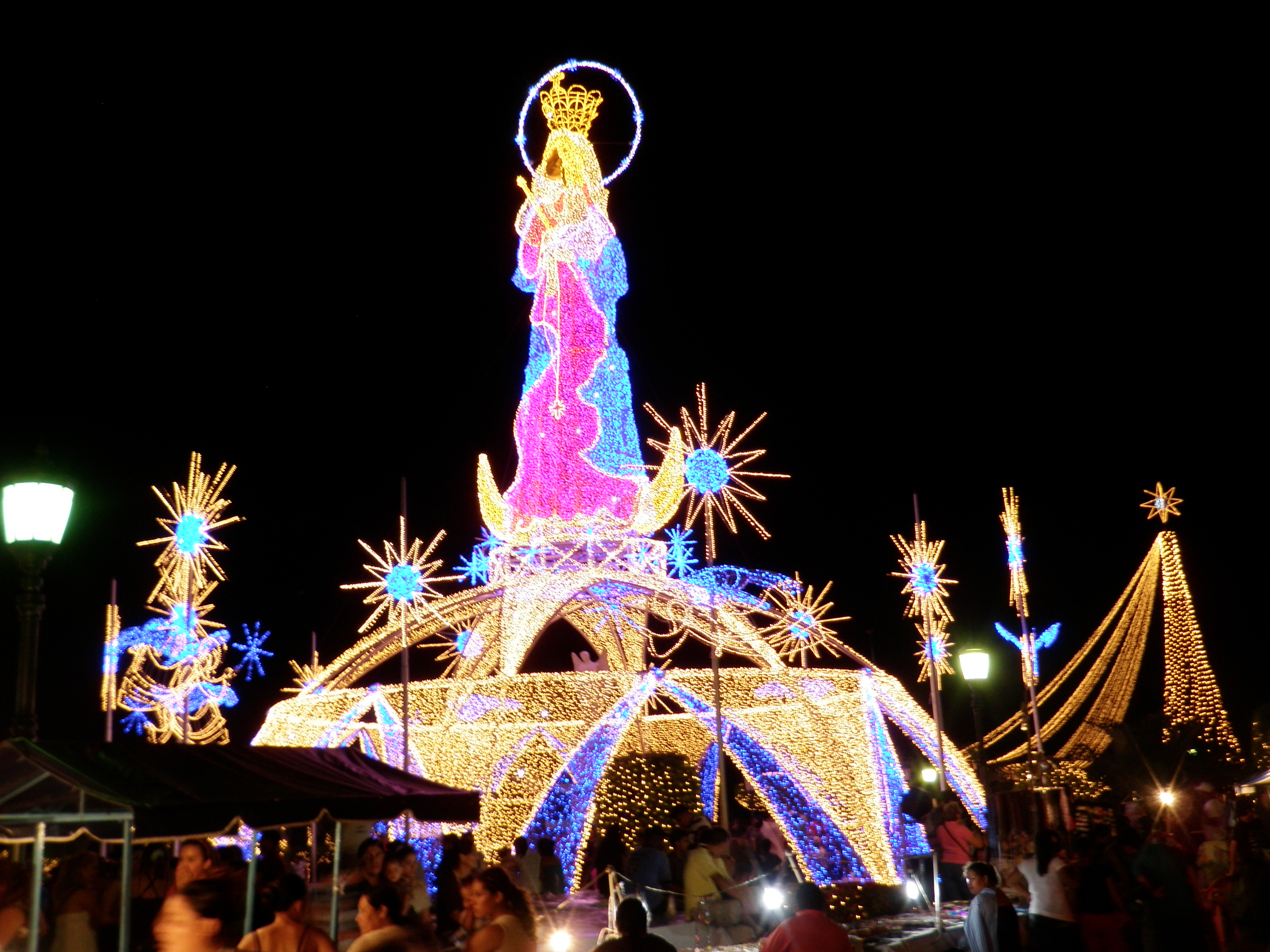
Traditional lighting of the lights at Maracaibo, Venezuela

In March 2008, the Colombian daily El Tiempo reported that a crisis that could have ended in an open conflict between Colombia, Ecuador and Venezuela was averted by Colombian President Alvaro Uribe confiding the situation to the intercession of Mary under the three different titles by which she is the countries’ patroness. The crisis started on March 1, when Uribe ordered a military raid into Ecuador's territory, against a rebel camp used by Marxist guerrillas to launch terrorist strikes. In response, Ecuador's President Rafael Correa cut all diplomatic relationships with Colombia. Venezuela's Hugo Chávez, Correa's political ally, ordered a massive military surge to the Colombian border as well. Quoting Fr. Julio Solórzano, Chaplain of Colombia's Presidential Palace, El Tiempo revealed that on March 5, with tensions increasing, President Uribe called for a Rosary to pray for the end of tensions. The Rosary, prayed at the Presidential Palace's chapel, was dedicated, upon Uribe's request, to Our Lady of Chiquinquira, Our Lady of Coromoto, and Our Lady of Mercy, respectively the patronesses of Colombia, Venezuela, and Ecuador. Uribe invited all officials at the Presidential palace to the Rosary, as well as the minister of Defense and the Interior. "For believers – El Tiempo wrote – the prayer was more than effective, since only two days later the presidents of the three countries shook hands, during the Group of Rio summit." On April 7, at the Dominican Republic summit, the three presidents vented their differences, but agreed to stand down after Colombia apologized for the raid.

== See also ==
- Our Lady of Chiquinquirá Cathedral, Sonsón
- Our Lady of the Rosary
- Catholic Mariology
- Roman Catholicism in Venezuela
- Romeria
- Verbena (fair)
