= List of diplomatic missions of Colombia =

This is a list of diplomatic missions of Colombia.

As of October 2026, Colombia currently has 73 embassies and 6 permanent missions to multilateral organizations. Honorary consulates and the overseas offices of ProColombia are excluded from this listing.

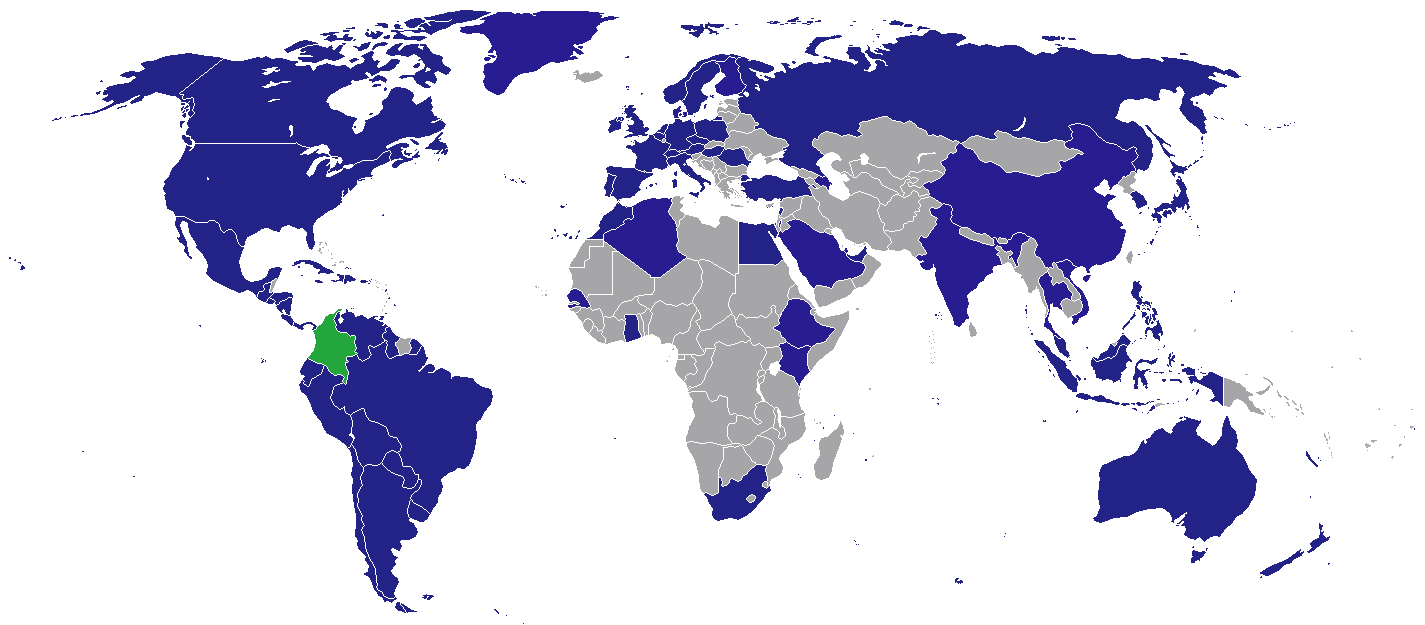
Republic of Colombia Countries hosting a Colombian embassy Countries hosting a Colombian consular mission or de facto embassy

== Current missions ==
=== Africa ===
Host country	Host city	Mission	Concurrent accreditation	Ref.
Algeria	Algiers	Embassy (Note: Slated for closure in 2026.)	Countries: Tunisia; Sahrawi Republic	
Egypt	Cairo	Embassy	Countries: Chad; Libya; Oman; Palestine; Sudan	
Ethiopia	Addis Ababa	Embassy	Countries: Central African Republic; Djibouti; Eritrea; South Sudan; Somalia; International Organizations: African Union	
Ghana	Accra	Embassy	Countries: Benin; Burkina Faso; Cameroon; Equatorial Guinea; Niger; Nigeria; São Tomé and Príncipe; Togo	
Kenya	Nairobi	Embassy	Countries: Burundi; Congo-Brazzaville; Congo-Kinshasa; Rwanda; Tanzania; Uganda; International Organizations: United Nations; United Nations Environment Programme; United Nations Human Settlements Programme	
Morocco	Rabat	Embassy		
Senegal	Dakar	Embassy	Countries: Cape Verde; Gambia; Guinea; Guinea-Bissau; Ivory Coast; Liberia; Mali; Mauritania; Sierra Leone	
South Africa	Pretoria	Embassy	Countries: Angola; Botswana; Comoros; Eswatini; Gabon; Lesotho; Madagascar; Malawi; Mauritius; Mozambique; Namibia; Seychelles; Zambia; Zimbabwe	

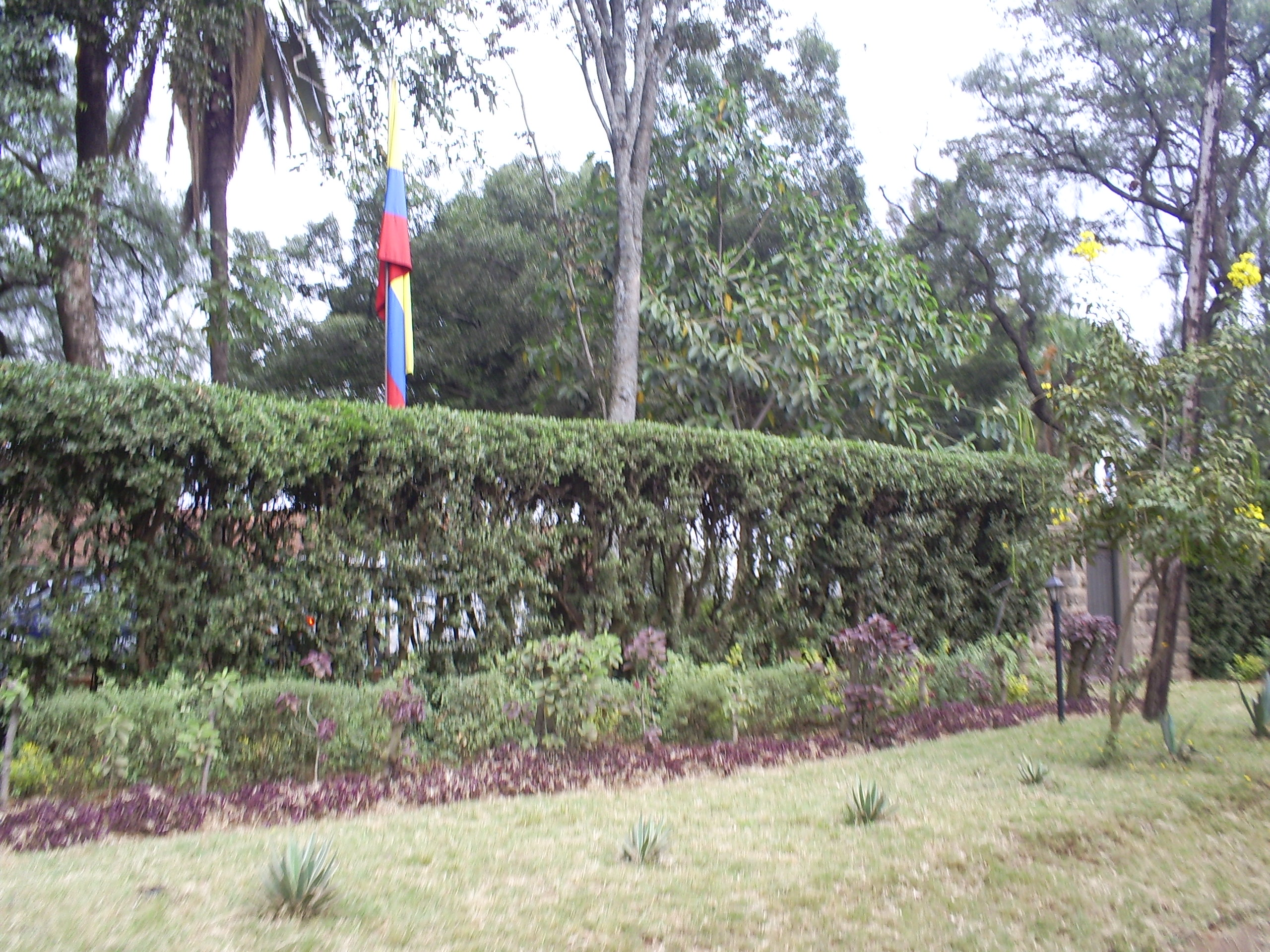
Embassy in Nairobi

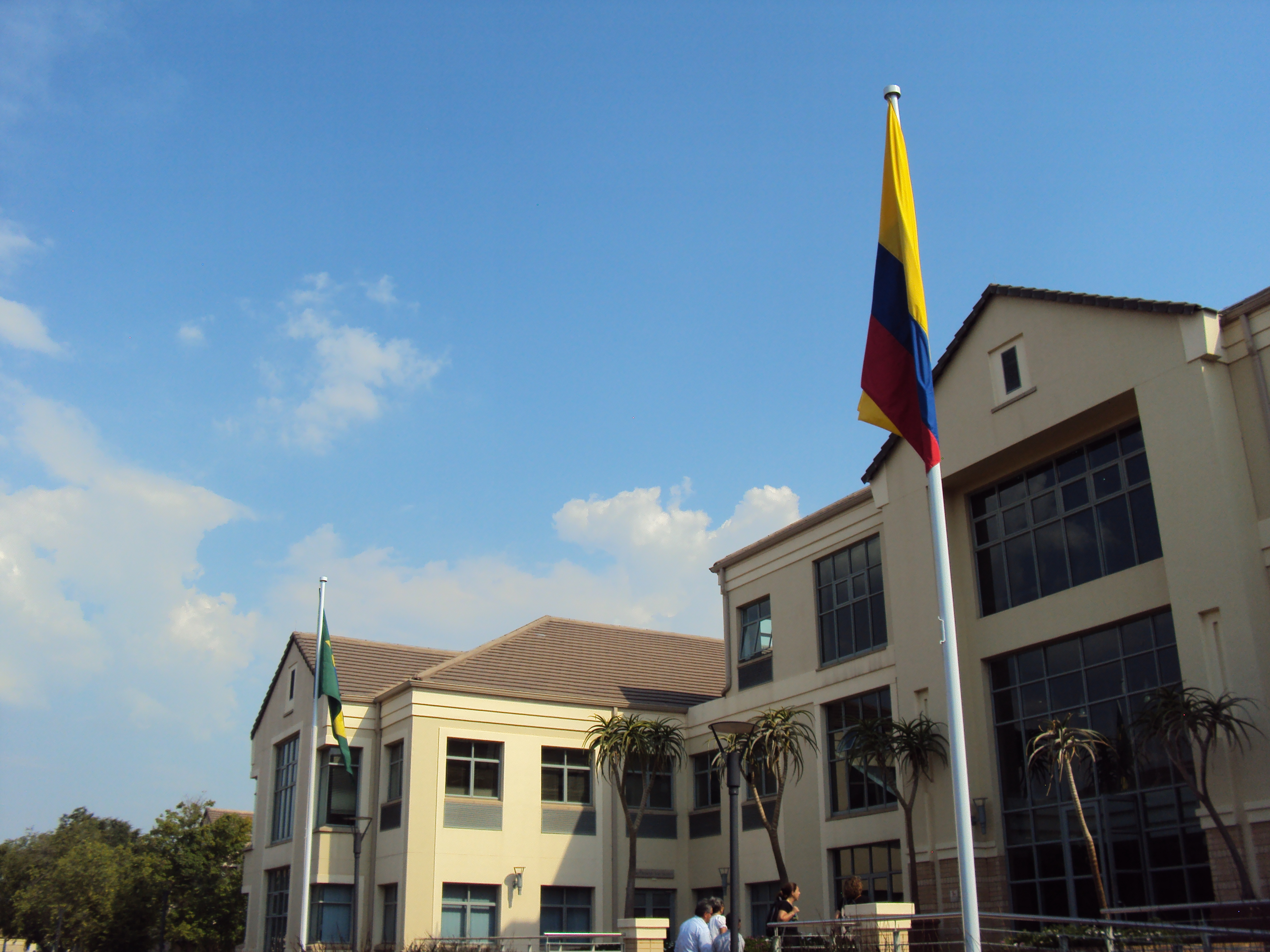
Embassy in Pretoria

=== Americas ===
Host country	Host city	Mission	Concurrent accreditation	Ref.
Argentina	Buenos Aires	Embassy		
Argentina	Buenos Aires	Consulate-General (Note: The embassy's consular section is treated a separate mission having consulate-general status.)		
Barbados	Bridgetown	Embassy	Countries: Antigua and Barbuda; Dominica; Saint Kitts and Nevis; Saint Lucia	
Bolivia	La Paz	Embassy		
Brazil	Brasília	Embassy		
Brazil	Manaus	Consulate-General		
Brazil	Rio de Janeiro	Consulate-General		
Brazil	São Paulo	Consulate-General		
Brazil	Tabatinga	Consulate		
Canada	Ottawa	Embassy		
Canada	Calgary	Consulate-General		
Canada	Montreal	Consulate-General		
Canada	Toronto	Consulate-General		
Canada	Vancouver	Consulate-General		
Chile	Santiago de Chile	Embassy		
Chile	Santiago de Chile	Consulate-General		
Chile	Antofagasta	Consulate-General		
Costa Rica	San José	Embassy		
Cuba	Havana	Embassy		
Dominican Republic	Santo Domingo	Embassy		
Ecuador	Quito	Embassy		
Ecuador	Quito	Consulate-General		
Ecuador	Guayaquil	Consulate-General		
Ecuador	Esmeraldas	Consulate-General		
Ecuador	Nueva Loja	Consulate		
Ecuador	Santo Domingo de los Colorados	Consulate		
Ecuador	Tulcán	Consulate		
El Salvador	San Salvador	Embassy	Countries: Belize	
Guatemala	Guatemala City	Embassy		
Guyana	Georgetown	Embassy	Countries: Suriname; International Organizations: Caribbean Community	
Haiti	Port-au-Prince	Embassy		
Honduras	Tegucigalpa	Embassy		
Jamaica	Kingston	Embassy	Countries: Bahamas	
Mexico	Mexico City	Embassy		
Mexico	Mexico City	Consulate-General		
Mexico	Cancún	Consulate-General		
Mexico	Guadalajara	Consulate		
Nicaragua	Managua	Embassy		
Panama	Panama City	Embassy		
Panama	Panama City	Consulate-General		
Panama	Colón	Consulate		
Panama	Jaqué	Consulate		
Panama	Puerto Obaldía	Consulate		
Paraguay	Asunción	Embassy		
Peru	Lima	Embassy		
Peru	Lima	Consulate-General		
Peru	Iquitos	Consulate		
Trinidad and Tobago	Port of Spain	Embassy	Countries: Grenada; Saint Vincent and the Grenadines; International Organizations: Association of Caribbean States	
United States	Washington, D.C.	Embassy		
United States	Atlanta	Consulate-General		
United States	Boston	Consulate-General		
United States	Chicago	Consulate-General		
United States	Houston	Consulate-General		
United States	Los Angeles	Consulate-General		
United States	Miami	Consulate-General		
United States	Newark	Consulate-General		
United States	New York City	Consulate-General		
United States	Orlando	Consulate-General		
United States	San Francisco	Consulate-General		
United States	San Juan (Puerto Rico)	Consulate-General		
Uruguay	Montevideo	Embassy	International Organizations: ALADI; Mercosur	
Venezuela	Caracas	Embassy		
Venezuela	Caracas	Consulate-General		
Venezuela	Maracaibo	Consulate-General		
Venezuela	Puerto La Cruz	Consulate-General		
Venezuela	San Cristóbal	Consulate-General		
Venezuela	San Antonio del Táchira	Consulate-General		
Venezuela	Barquisimeto	Consulate		
Venezuela	Puerto Ordaz	Consulate		

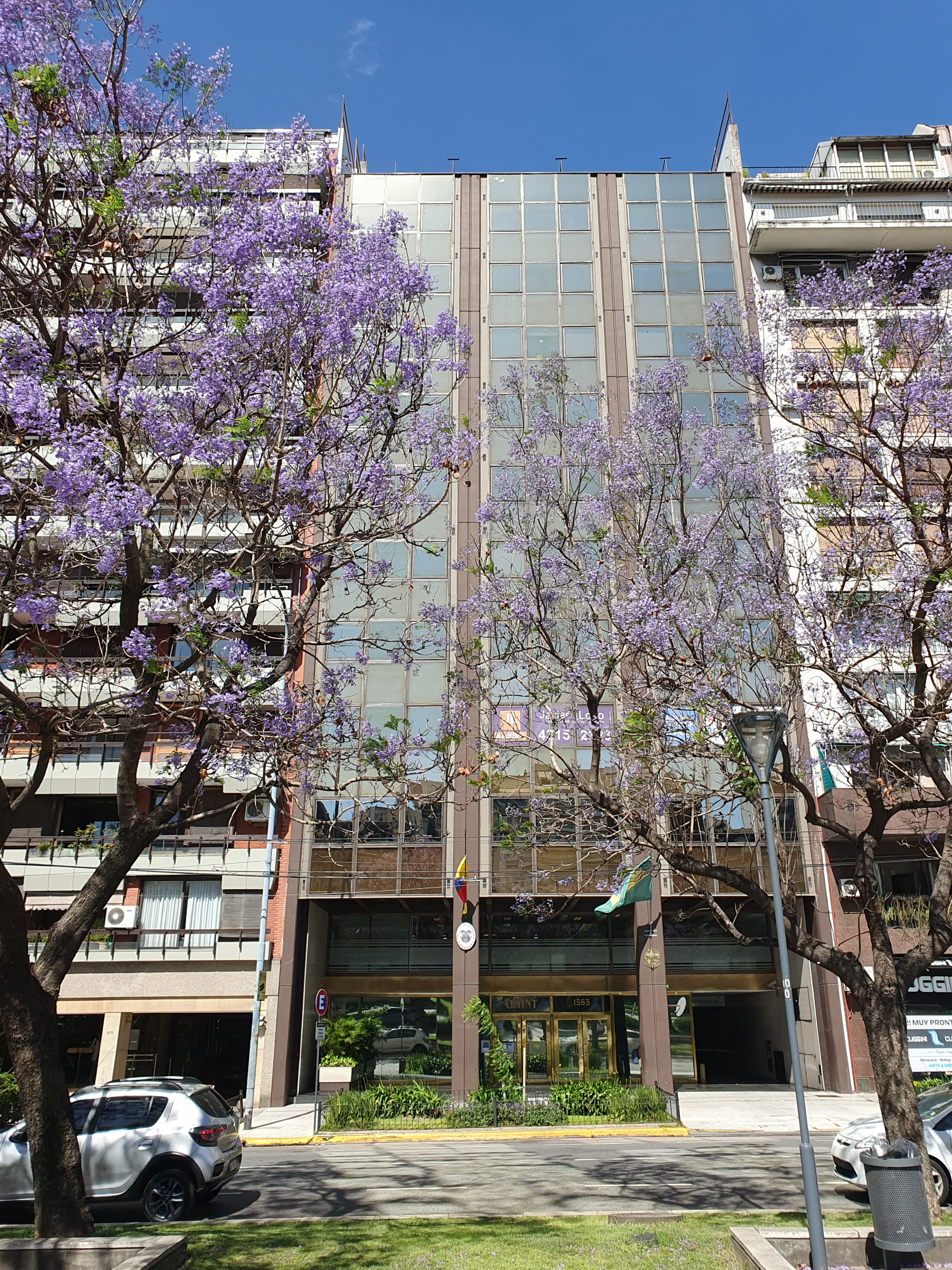
Building hosting the Embassy in Buenos Aires

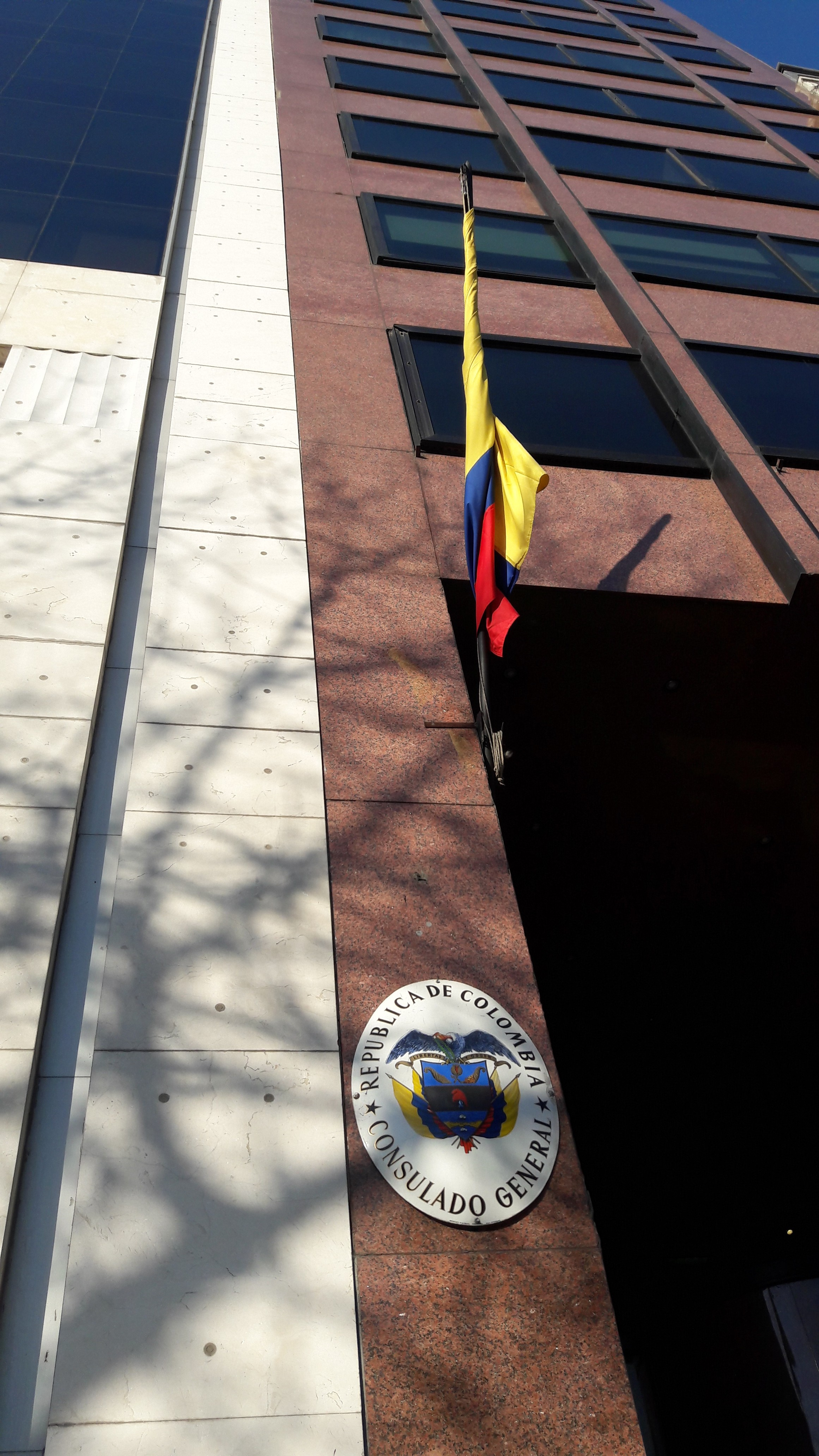
Consulate-General in Buenos Aires

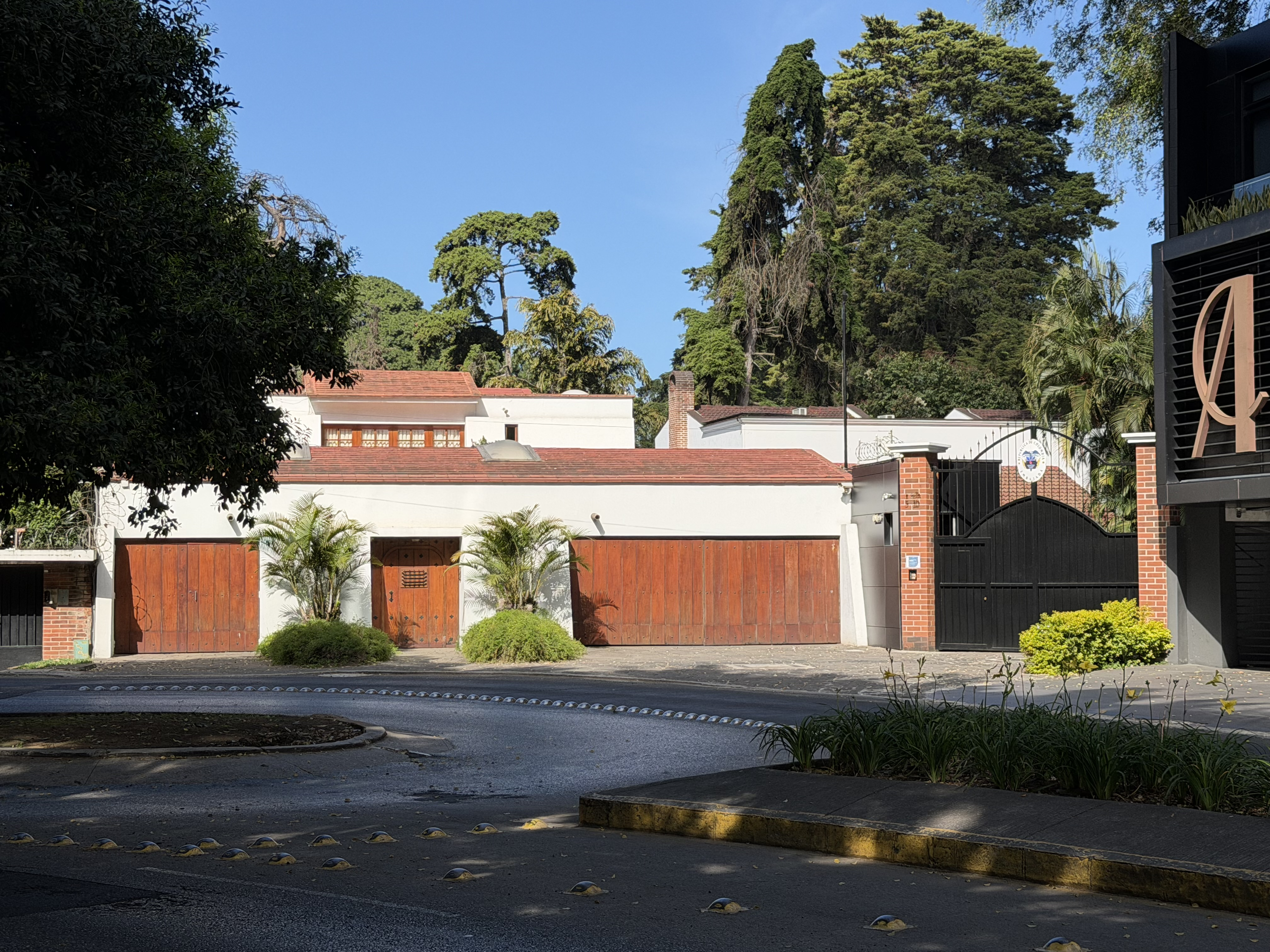
Embassy in Guatemala City

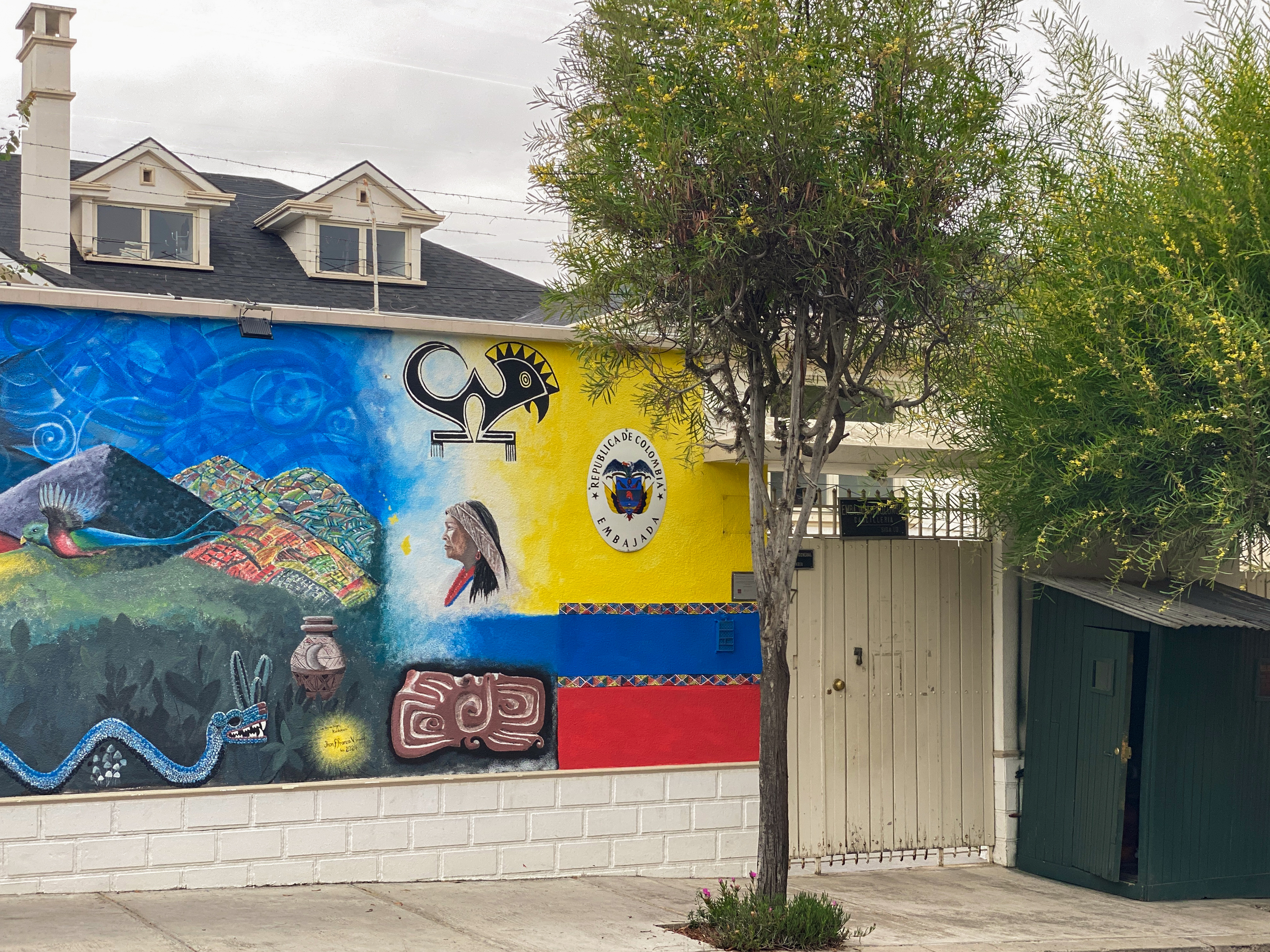
Embassy in La Paz

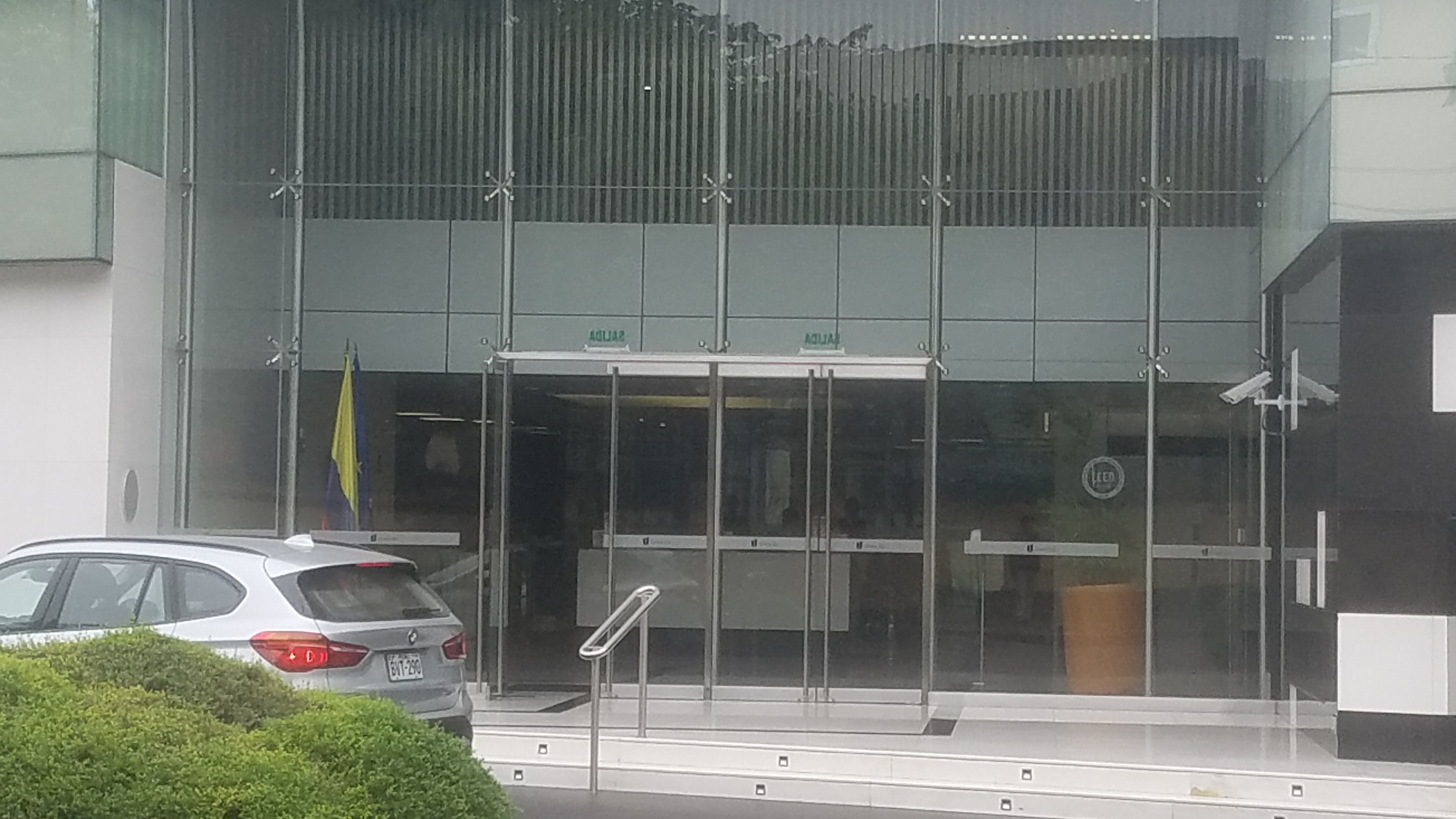
Embassy in Lima

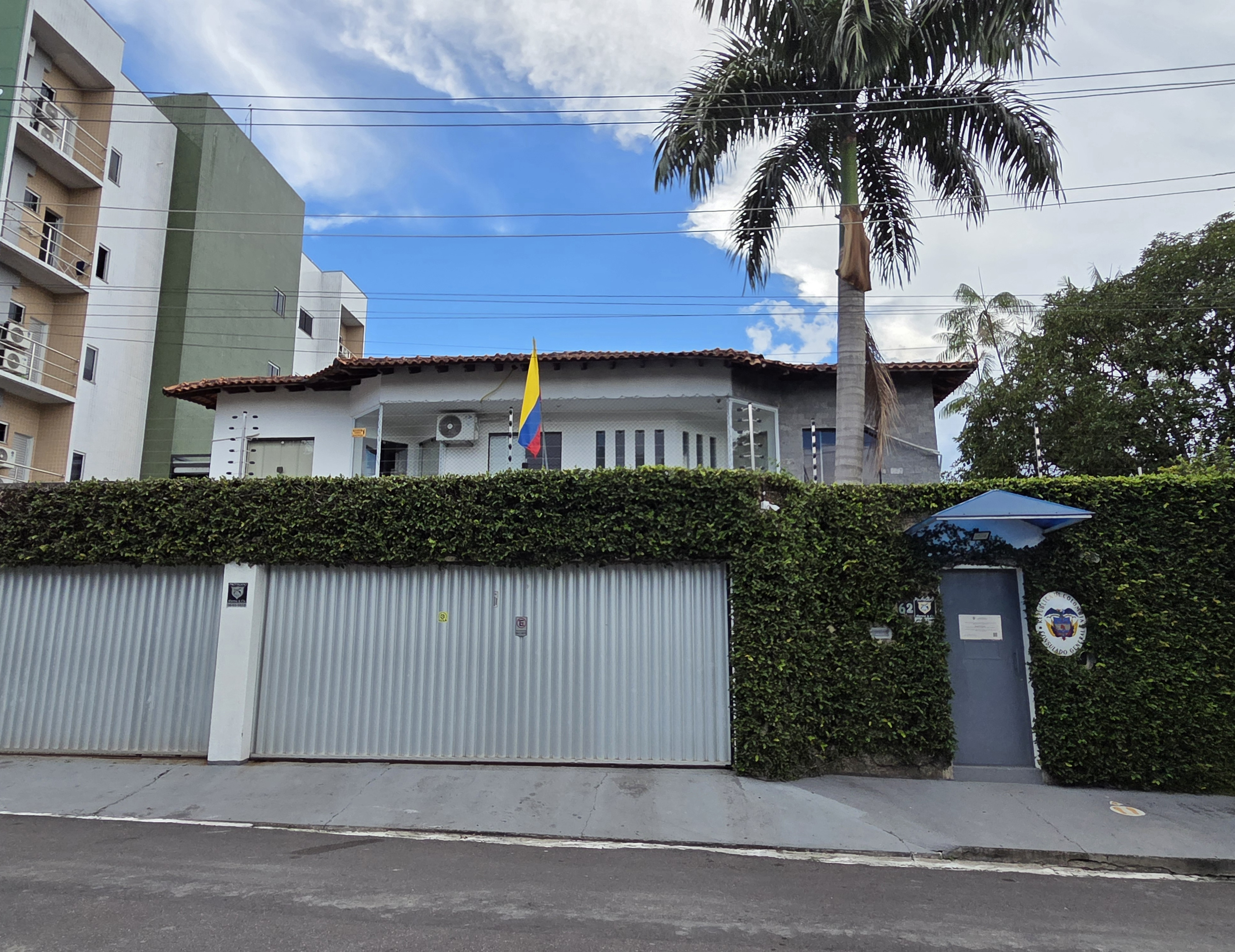
Consulate-General in Manaus

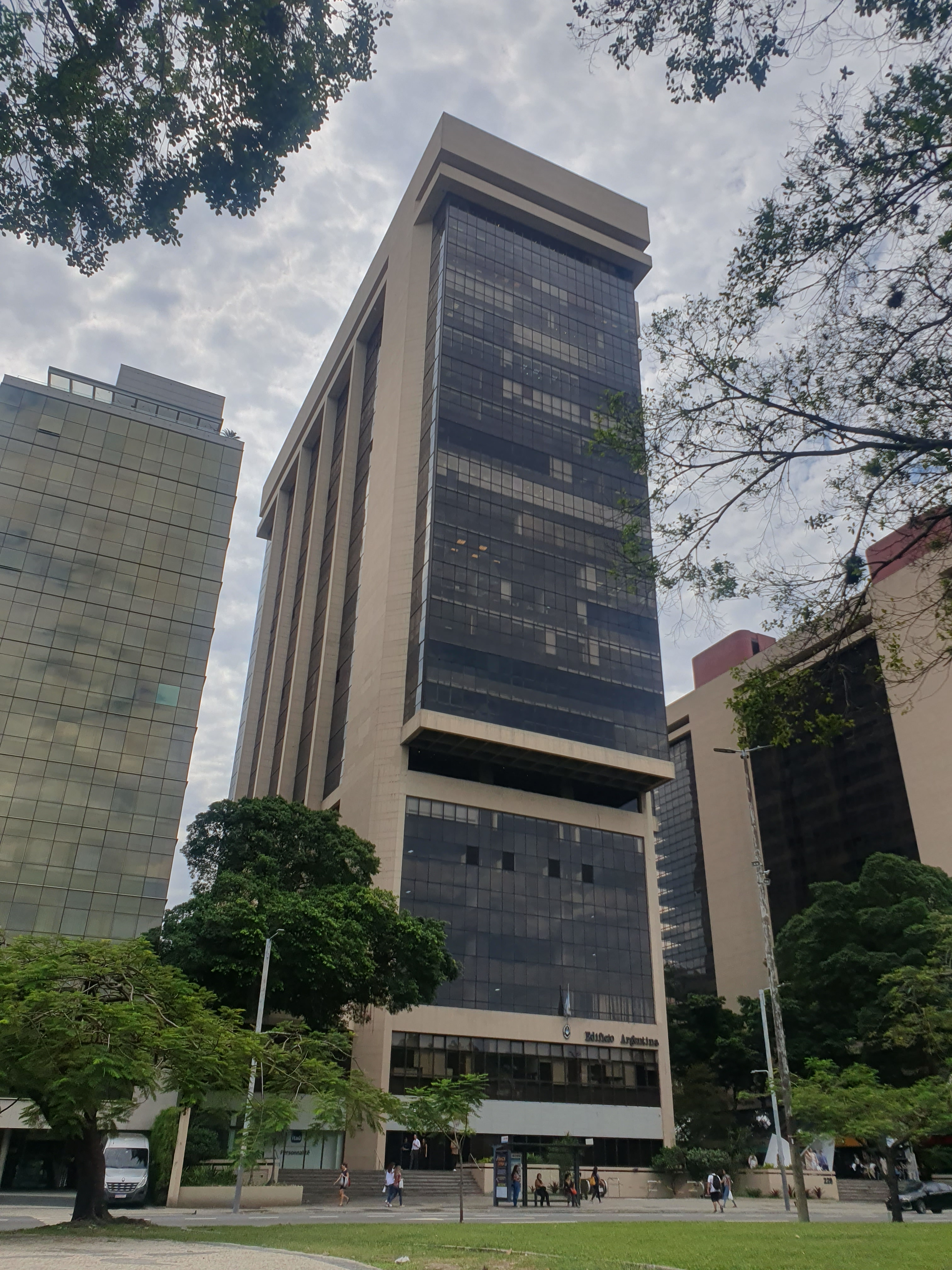
Building hosting the Consulate-General in Rio de Janeiro

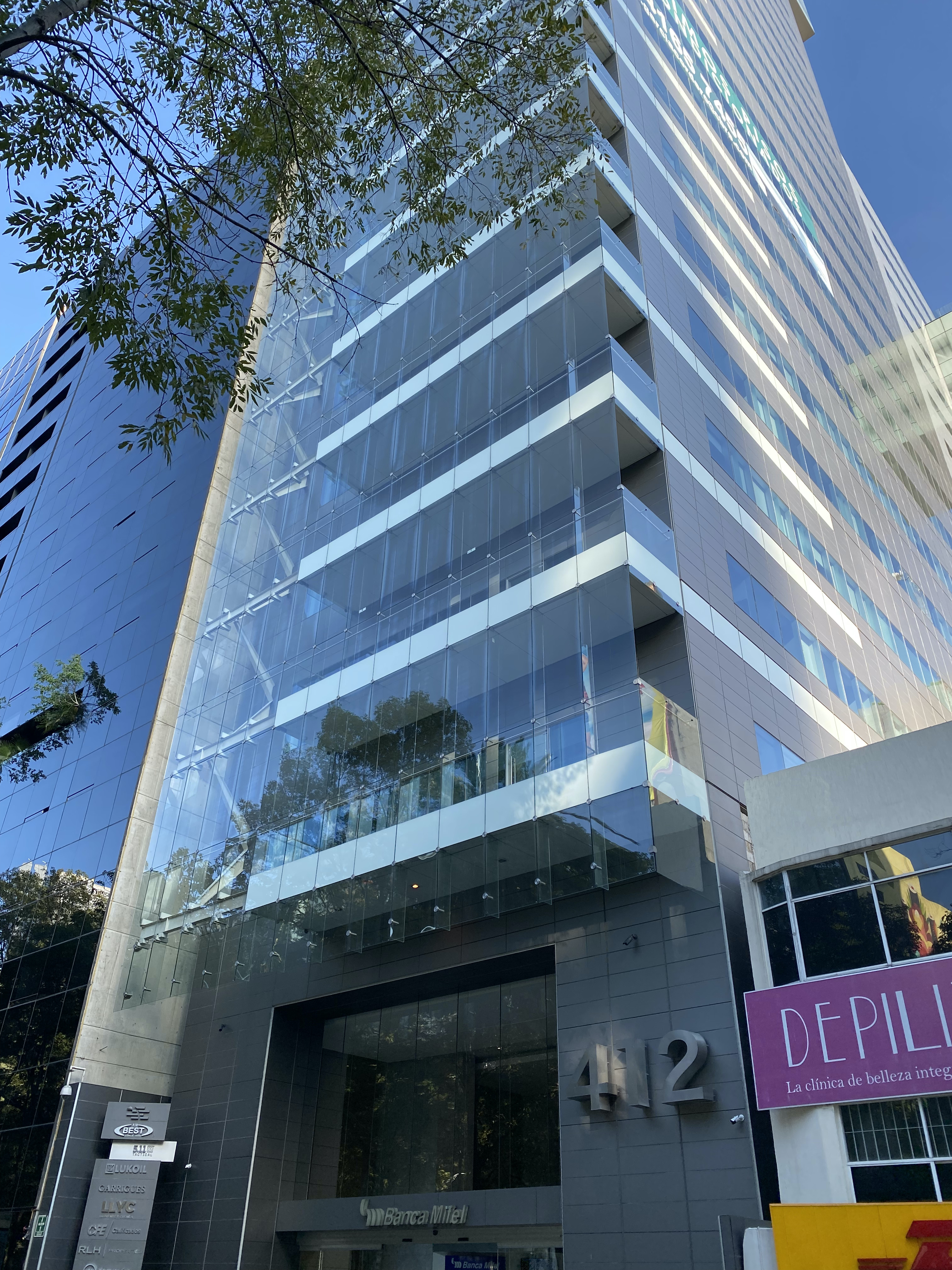
Building hosting the embassy in Mexico City

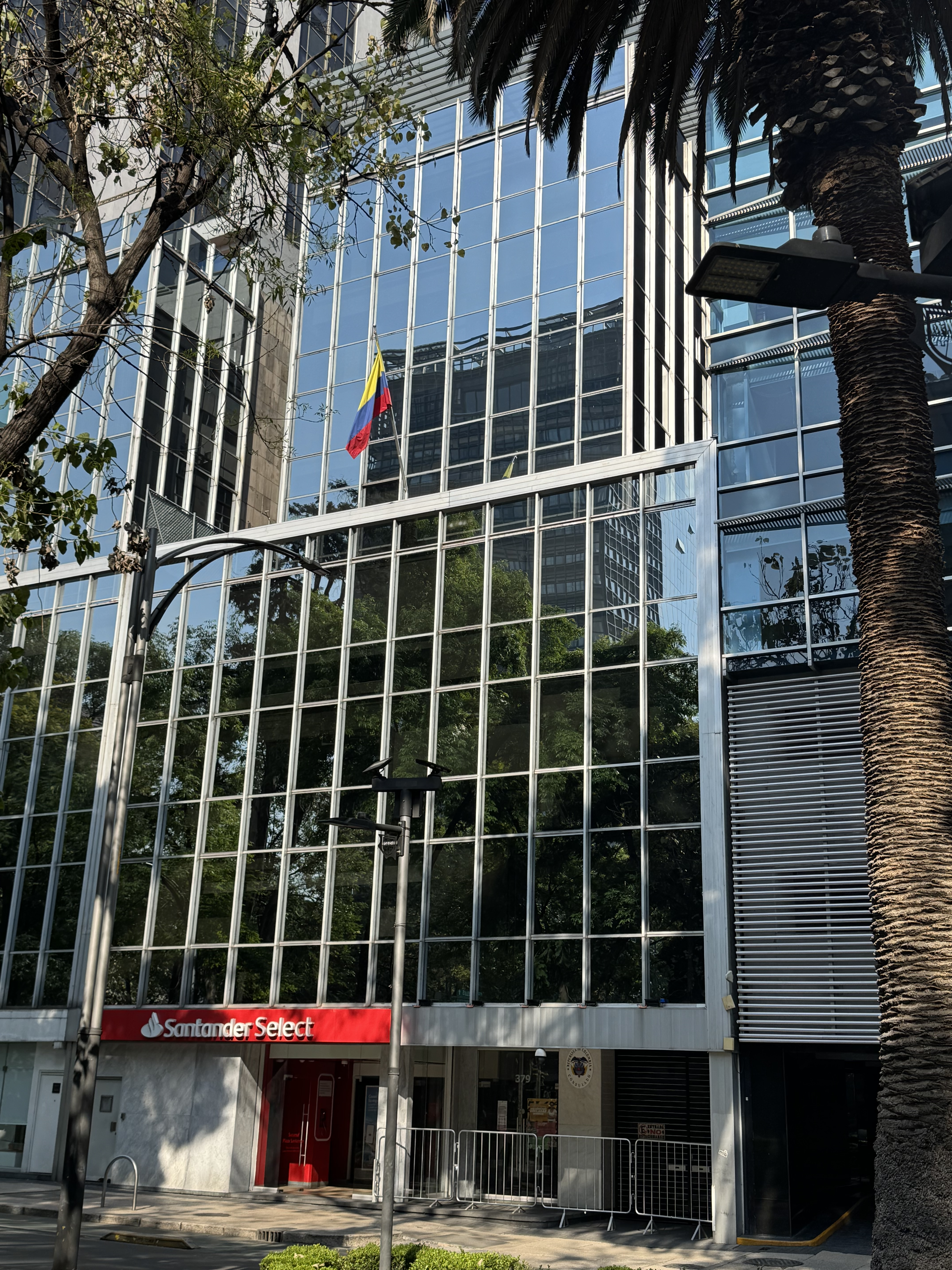
Consulate-General in Mexico City

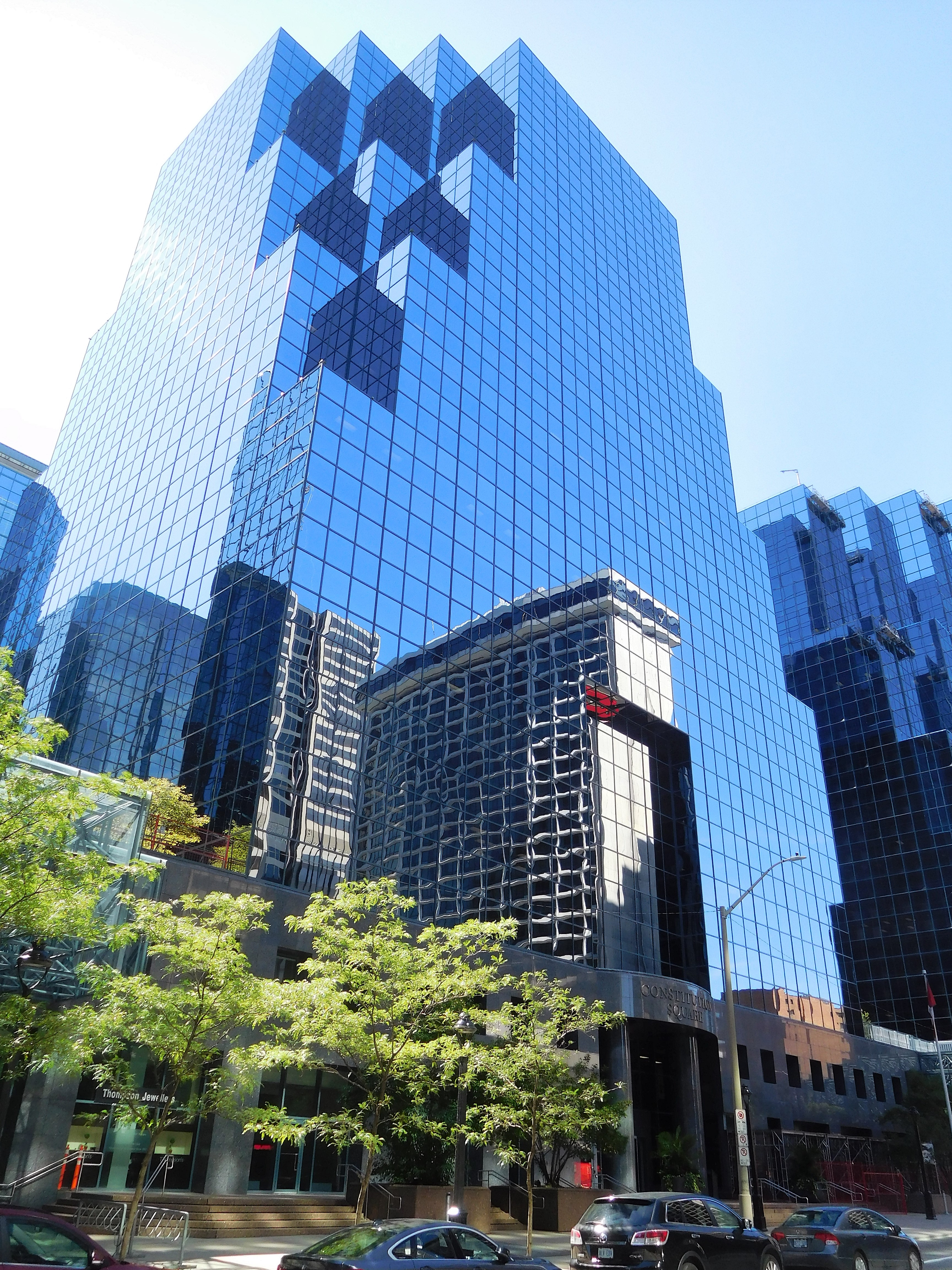
Building hosting the Embassy in Ottawa

Consulate-General in Calgary

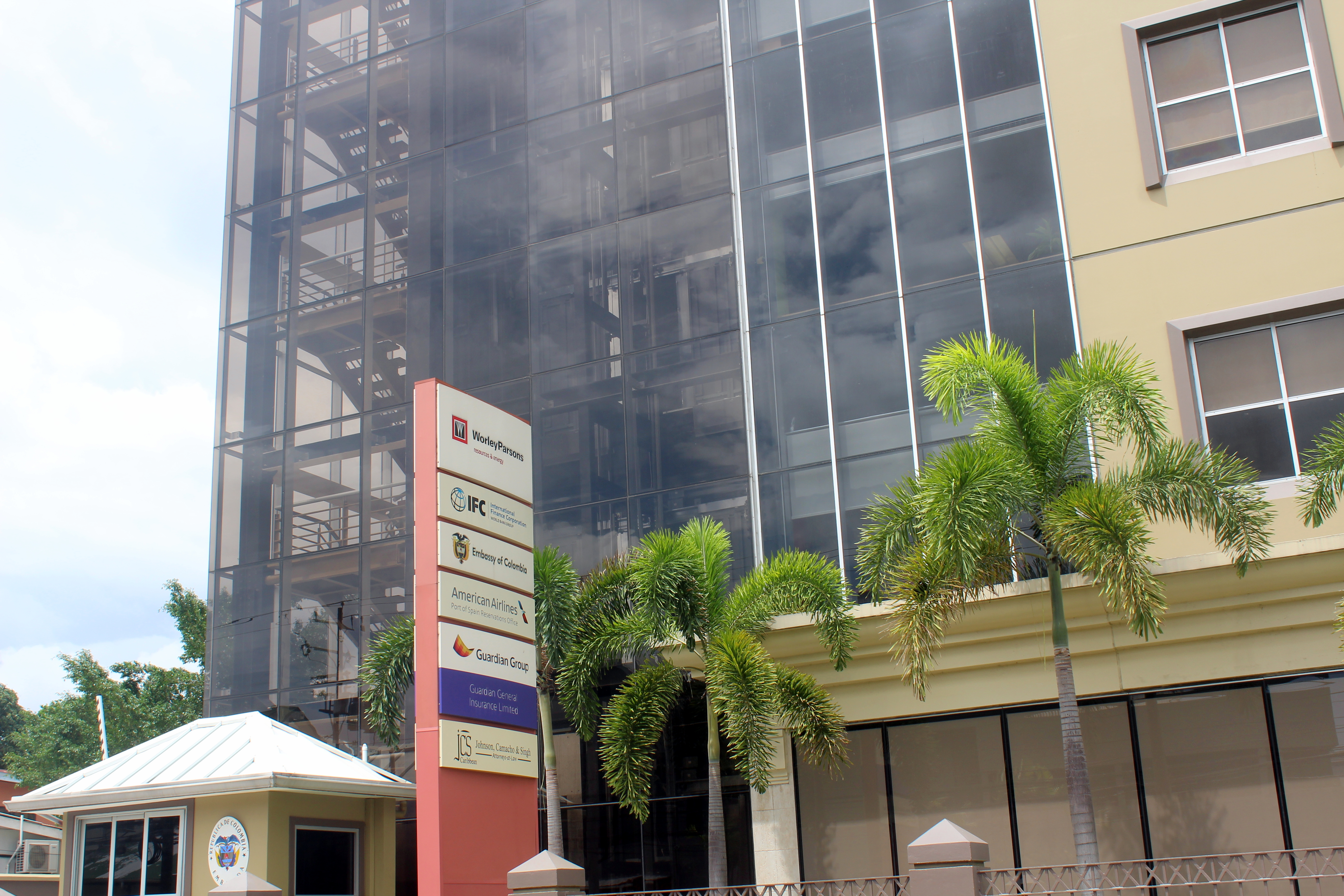
Embassy in Port of Spain

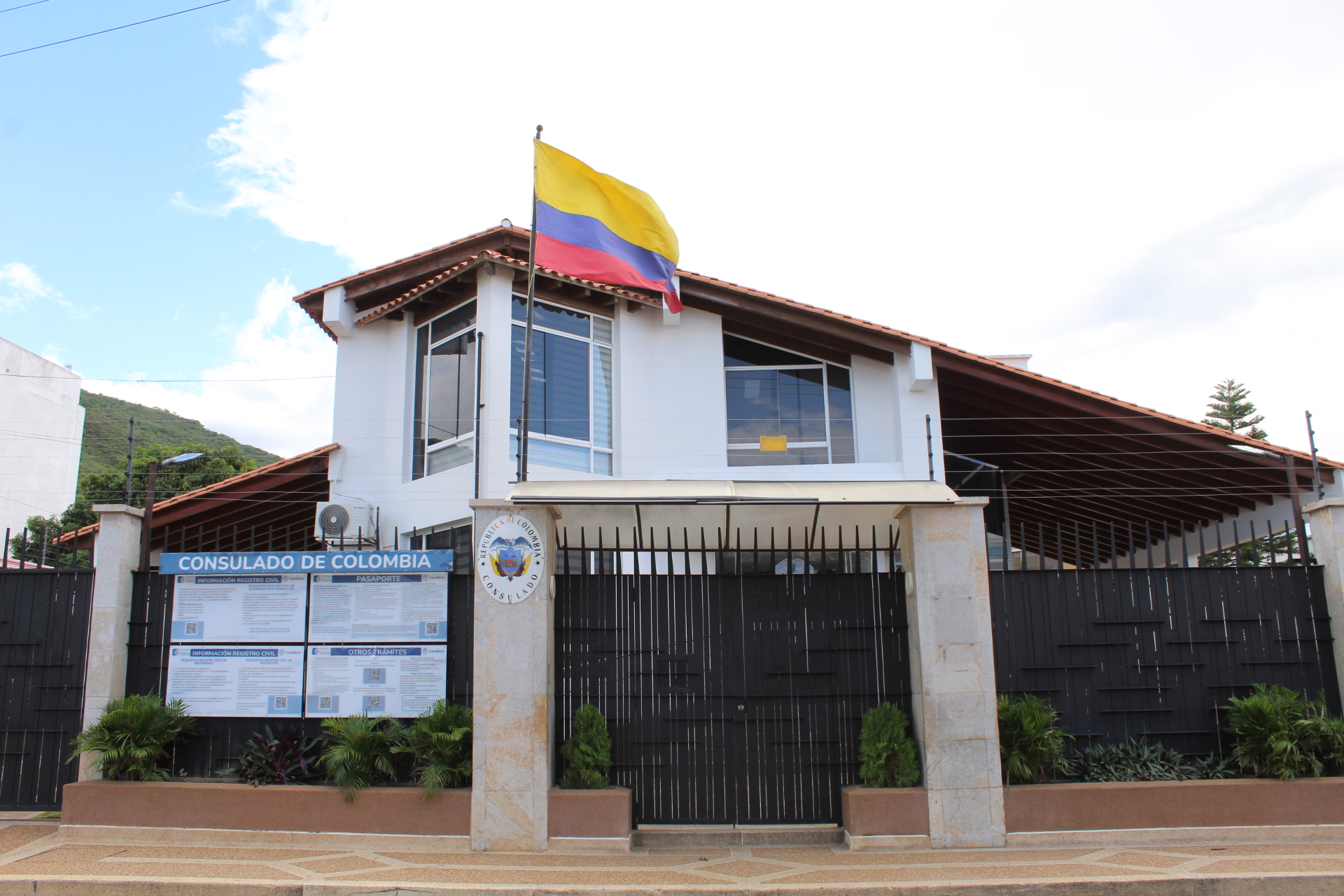
Consulate in San Antonio del Tachira

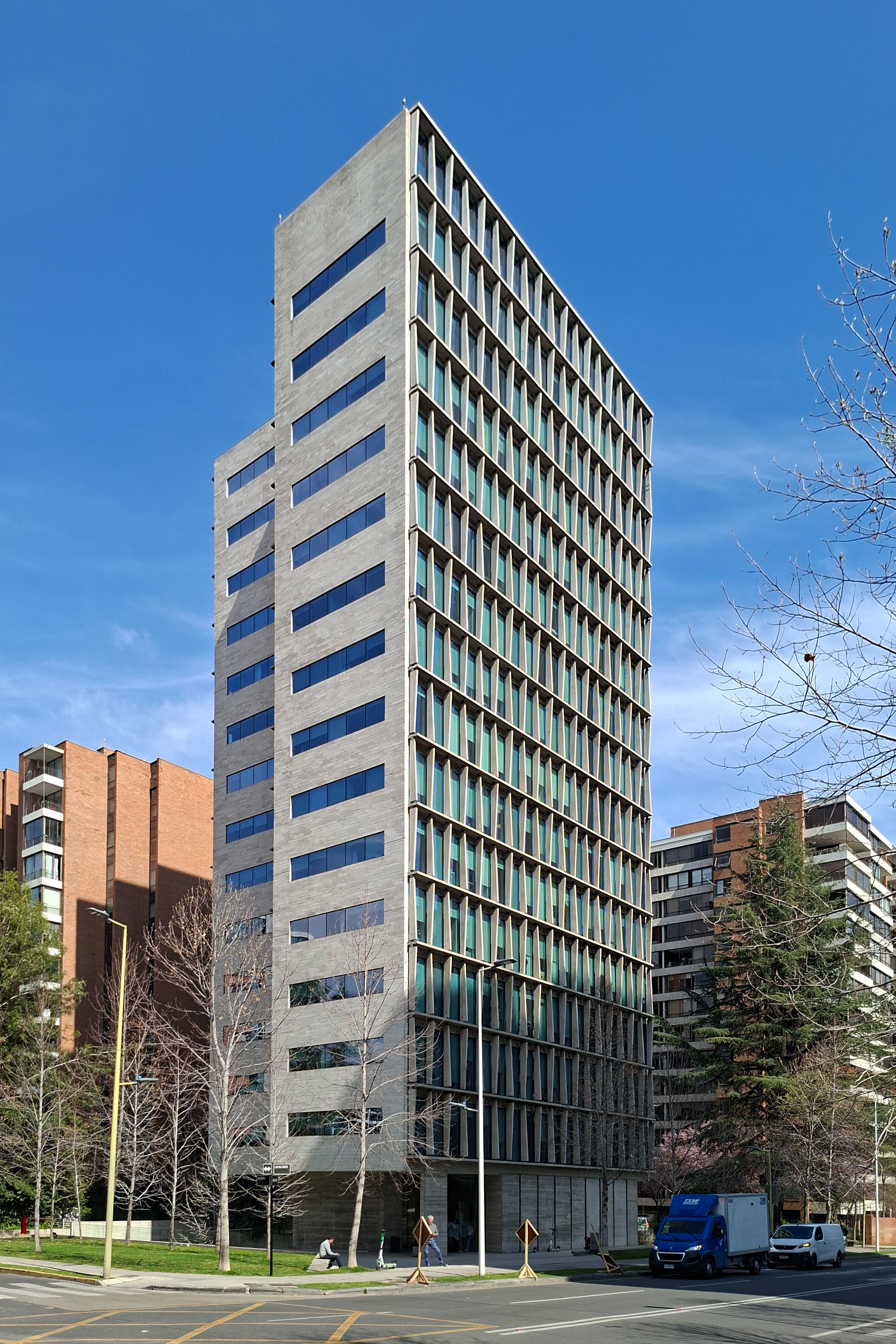
Building hosting the Embassy in Santiago

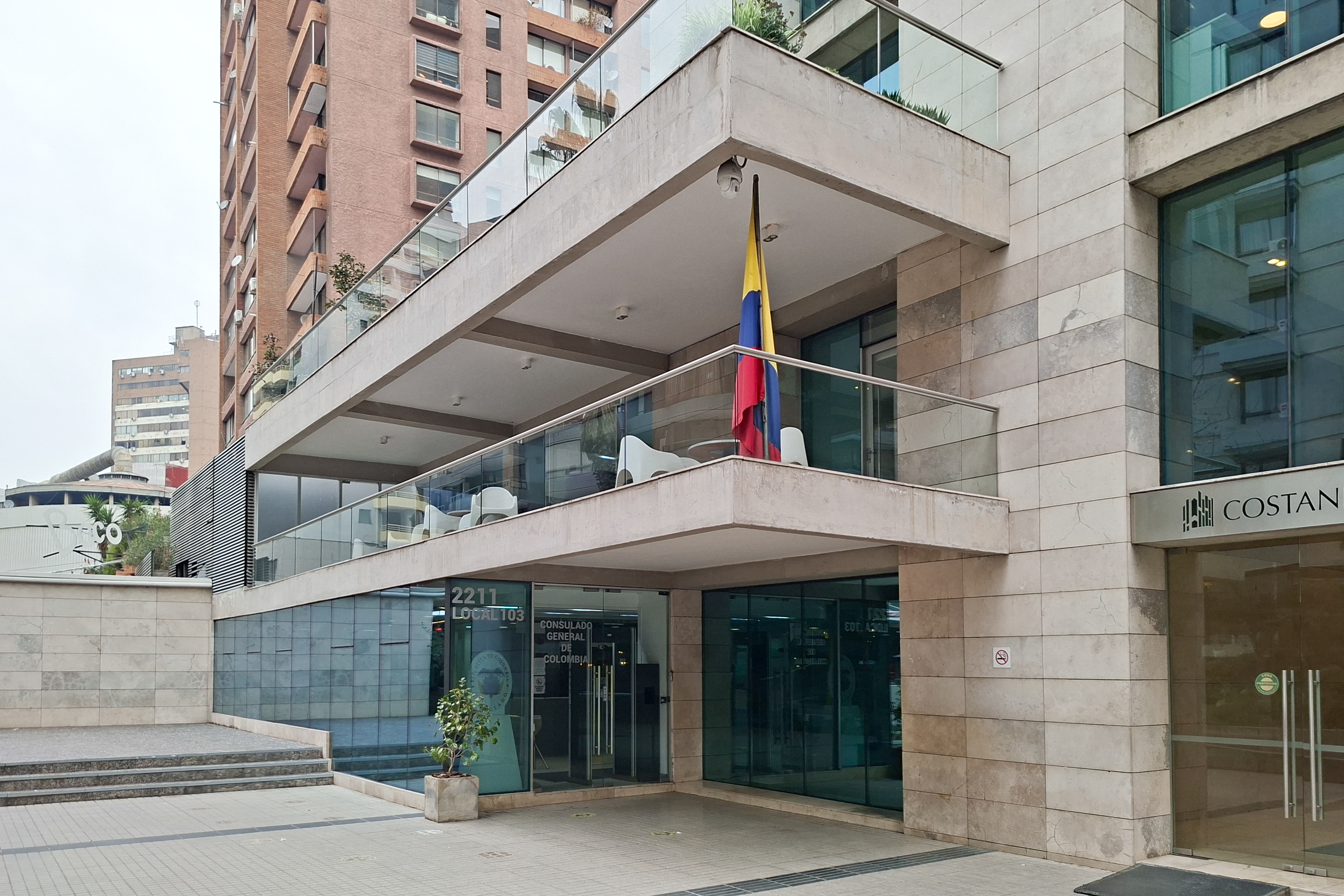
Consulate-General in Santiago

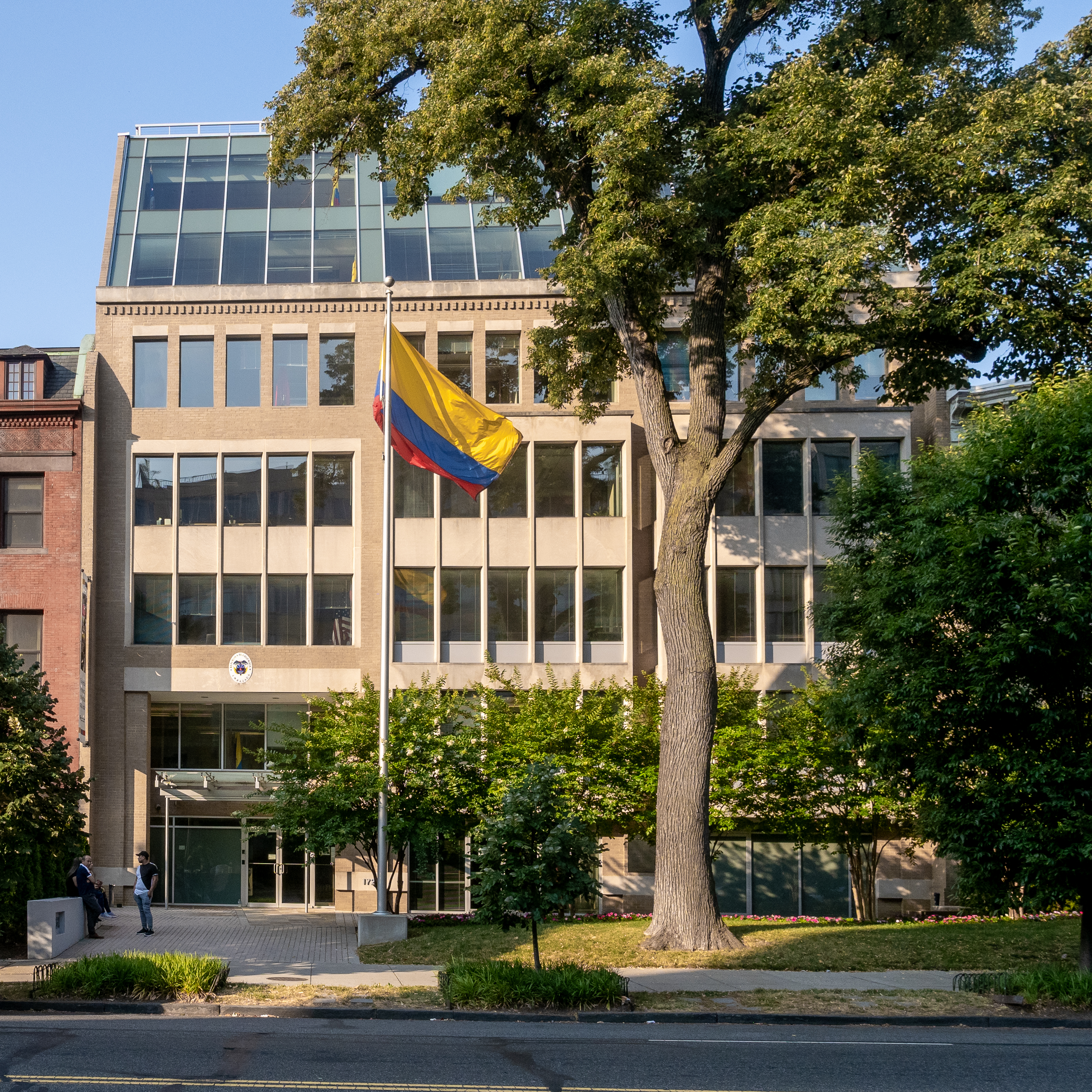
Embassy in Washington, D.C.

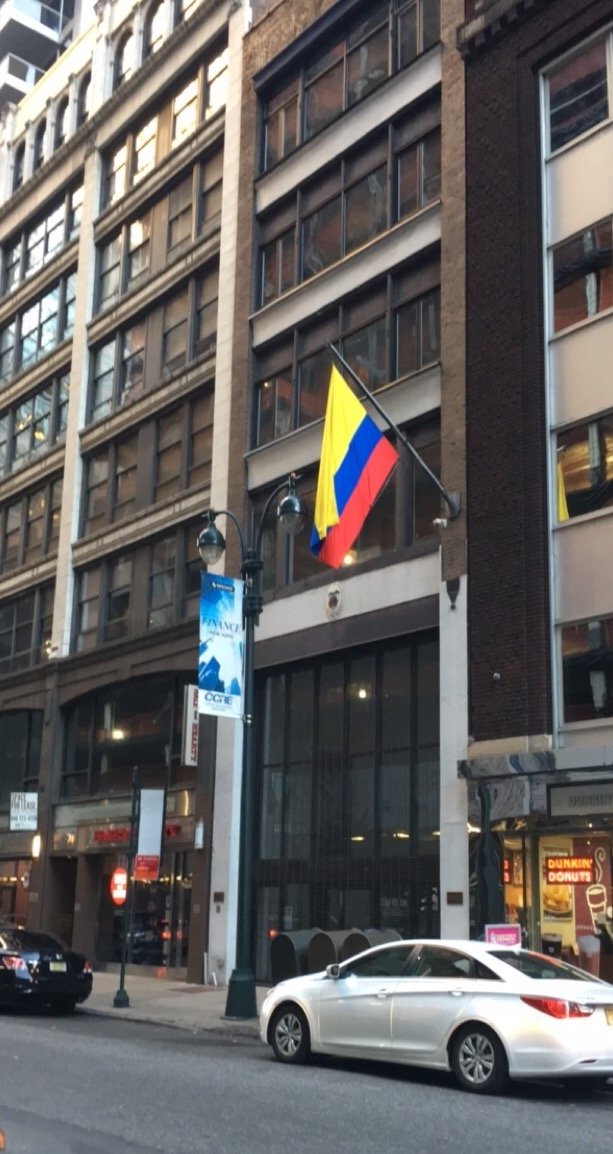
Consulate-General in New York City

=== Asia ===
Host country	Host city	Mission	Concurrent accreditation	Ref.
Azerbaijan	Baku	Embassy		
China	Beijing	Embassy		
China	Guangzhou	Consulate-General		
China	Hong Kong	Consulate-General		
China	Shanghai	Consulate-General		
India	New Delhi	Embassy	Countries: Afghanistan; Bangladesh; Bhutan; Maldives; Nepal; Sri Lanka	
Indonesia	Jakarta	Embassy	Countries: Timor-Leste; International Organizations: Association of Southeast Asian Nations (Note: Accredited as an observer mission.)	
Israel	Jerusalem	Embassy		
Japan	Tokyo	Embassy		
Lebanon	Beirut	Embassy	Countries: Jordan; Syria	
Malaysia	Kuala Lumpur	Embassy		
Philippines	Manila	Embassy	Countries: Marshall Islands; Micronesia; Palau	
Qatar	Doha	Embassy	Countries: Kuwait	
Saudi Arabia	Riyadh	Embassy	Countries: Bahrain; Iraq	
Singapore	Singapore	Embassy	Countries: Brunei	
South Korea	Seoul	Embassy	Countries: Mongolia	
Thailand	Bangkok	Embassy	Countries: Cambodia; Myanmar	
Turkey	Ankara	Embassy	Countries: Georgia; Pakistan	
Turkey	Istanbul	Consulate-General	Countries: Georgia; Pakistan	
United Arab Emirates	Abu Dhabi	Embassy	Countries: Yemen	
Vietnam	Hanoi	Embassy	Countries: Laos	

Building hosting the Embassy in Baku

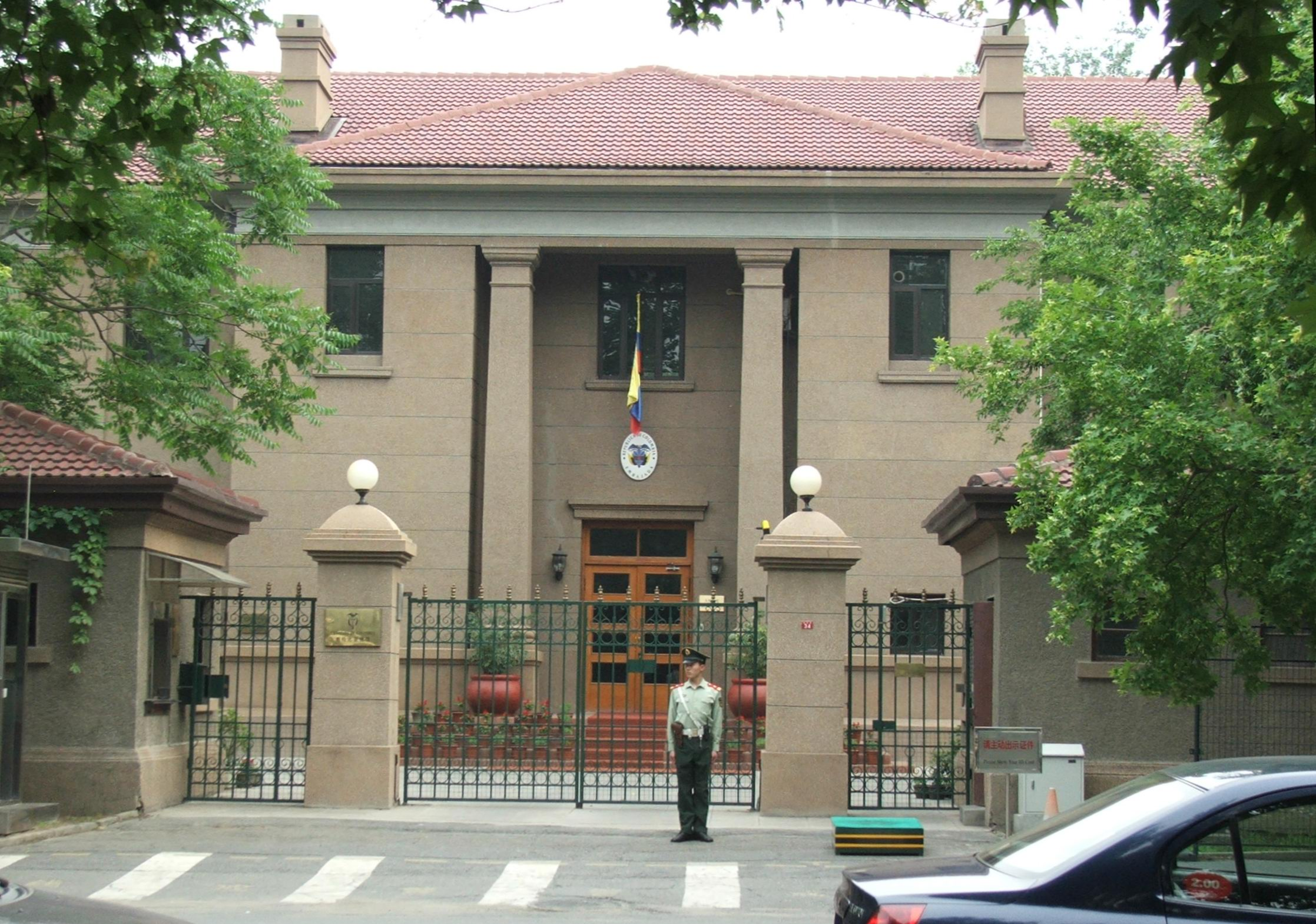
Embassy in Beijing

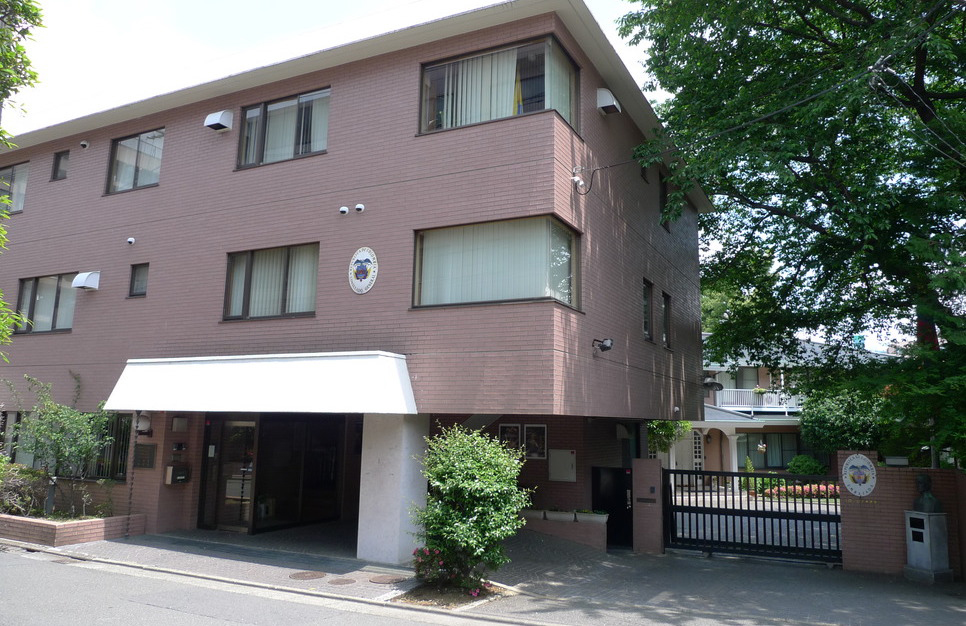
Embassy in Tokyo

=== Europe ===
Host country	Host city	Mission	Concurrent accreditation	Ref.
Austria	Vienna	Embassy	International Organizations: United Nations; International Atomic Energy Agency; UNIDO; United Nations Office on Drugs and Crime	
Belgium	Brussels	Embassy	Countries: Luxembourg; International Organizations: European Union; NATO	
Czechia	Prague	Embassy	Countries: Croatia; Slovakia; Slovenia	
Denmark	Copenhagen	Embassy		
Finland	Helsinki	Embassy		
France	Paris	Embassy	Countries: Monaco	
France	Paris	Consulate-General	Countries: Monaco	
Germany	Berlin	Embassy		
Germany	Frankfurt	Consulate-General		
Holy See (Note: The Colombian Embassy to the Holy See is located outside Vatican territory in Rome.)	Rome	Embassy	Sovereign Entity: Sovereign Military Order of Malta	
Hungary	Budapest	Embassy	Countries: Bosnia and Herzegovina; Montenegro; North Macedonia; Serbia	
Ireland	Dublin	Embassy		
Italy	Rome	Embassy	Countries: Albania; Cyprus; Greece; Kosovo; Malta; San Marino	
Italy	Rome	Consulate-General	Countries: Albania; Cyprus; Greece; Kosovo; Malta; San Marino	
Italy	Milan	Consulate-General	Countries: Albania; Cyprus; Greece; Kosovo; Malta; San Marino	
Netherlands	The Hague	Embassy	International Organizations: Organisation for the Prohibition of Chemical Weapons	
Netherlands	Amsterdam	Consulate-General	International Organizations: Organisation for the Prohibition of Chemical Weapons	
Netherlands	Oranjestad, Aruba	Consulate	International Organizations: Organisation for the Prohibition of Chemical Weapons	
Netherlands	Willemstad, Curaçao	Consulate	International Organizations: Organisation for the Prohibition of Chemical Weapons	
Norway	Oslo	Embassy		
Poland	Warsaw	Embassy	Countries: Estonia; Latvia; Lithuania; Ukraine	
Portugal	Lisbon	Embassy		
Romania	Bucharest	Embassy	Countries: Bulgaria; Moldova	
Russia	Moscow	Embassy	Countries: Armenia; Belarus; Kazakhstan; Kyrgyzstan; Tajikistan; Turkmenistan; Uzbekistan	
Spain	Madrid	Embassy	Countries: Andorra; International Organizations: World Tourism Organization	
Spain	Madrid	Consulate-General	Countries: Andorra; International Organizations: World Tourism Organization	
Spain	Barcelona	Consulate-General	Countries: Andorra; International Organizations: World Tourism Organization	
Spain	Seville	Consulate-General	Countries: Andorra; International Organizations: World Tourism Organization	
Spain	Valencia	Consulate-General	Countries: Andorra; International Organizations: World Tourism Organization	
Spain	Bilbao	Consulate	Countries: Andorra; International Organizations: World Tourism Organization	
Spain	Las Palmas de Gran Canaria	Consulate	Countries: Andorra; International Organizations: World Tourism Organization	
Spain	Palma de Mallorca	Consulate	Countries: Andorra; International Organizations: World Tourism Organization	
Sweden	Stockholm	Embassy	Countries: Iceland	
Switzerland	Bern	Embassy	Countries: Liechtenstein	
United Kingdom	London	Embassy		
United Kingdom	London	Consulate-General		

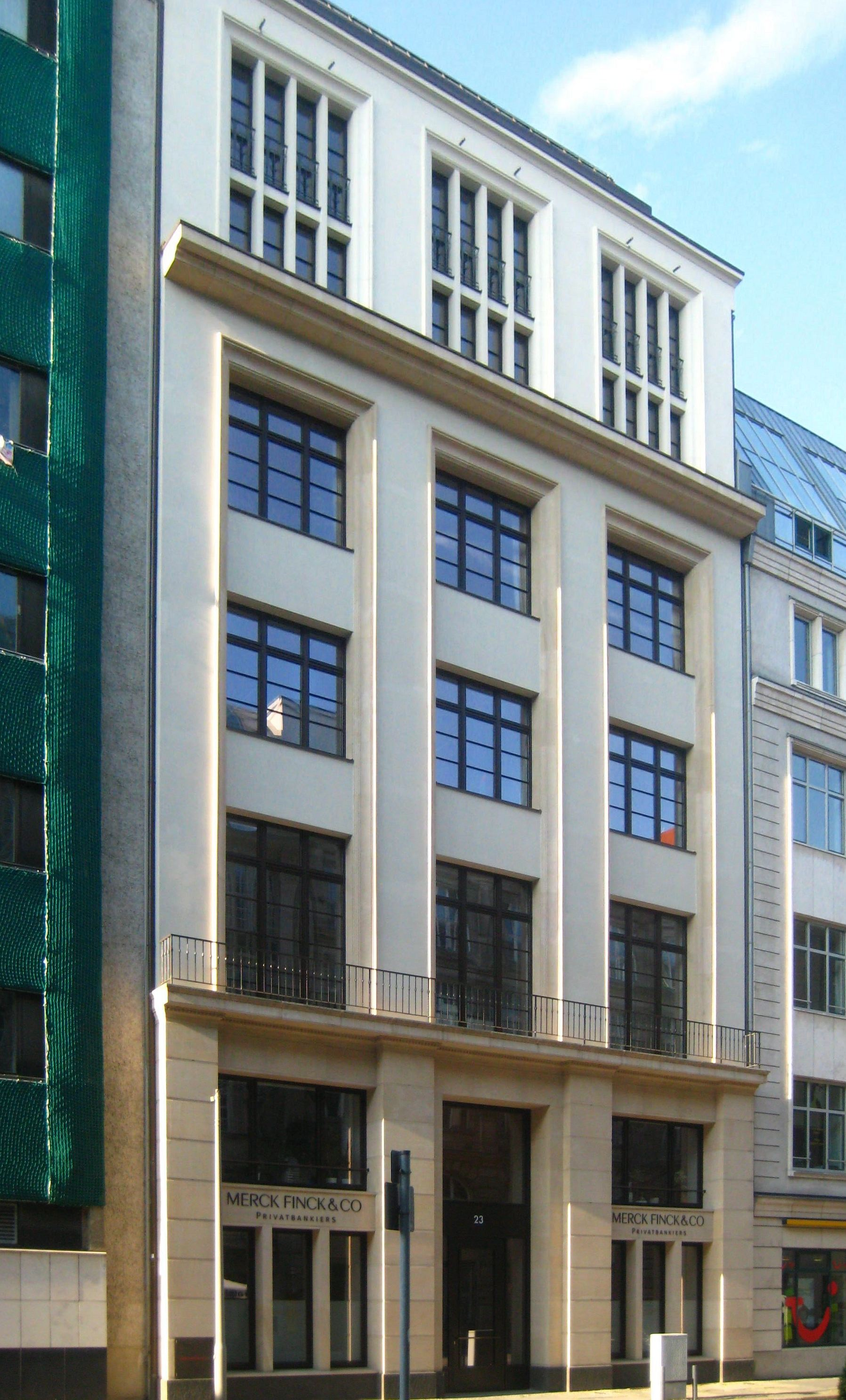
Embassy in Berlin

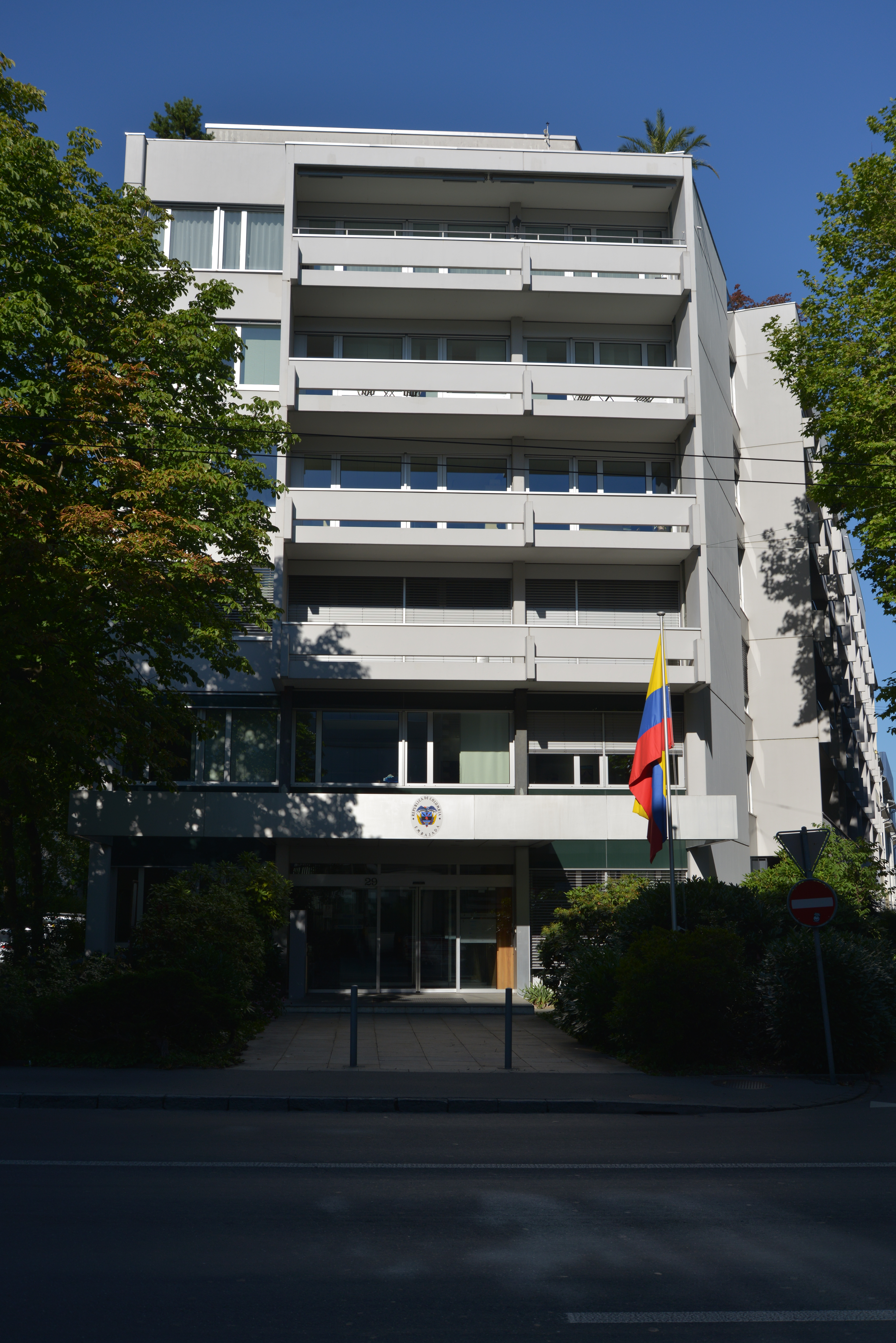
Embassy in Bern

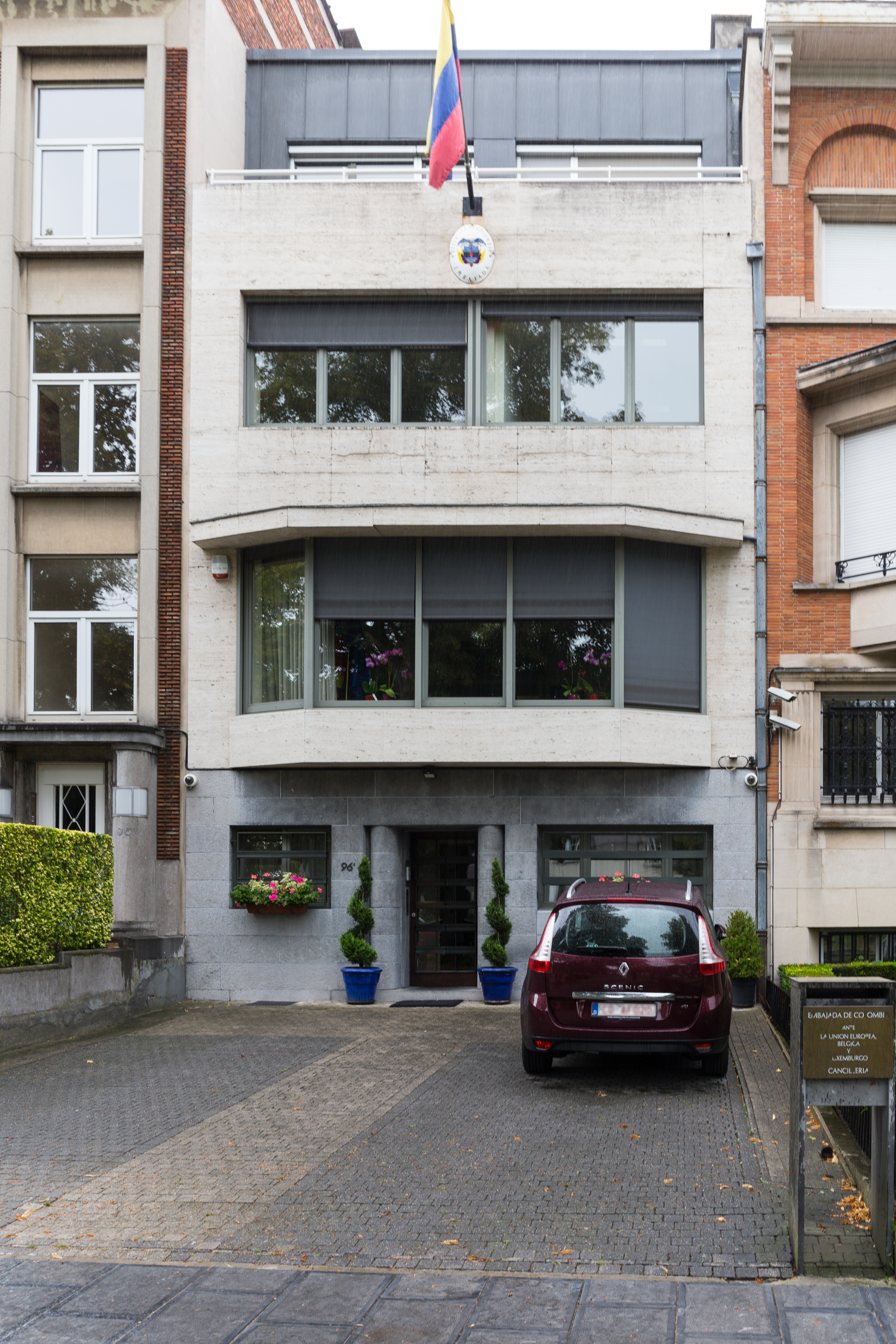
Embassy in Brussels

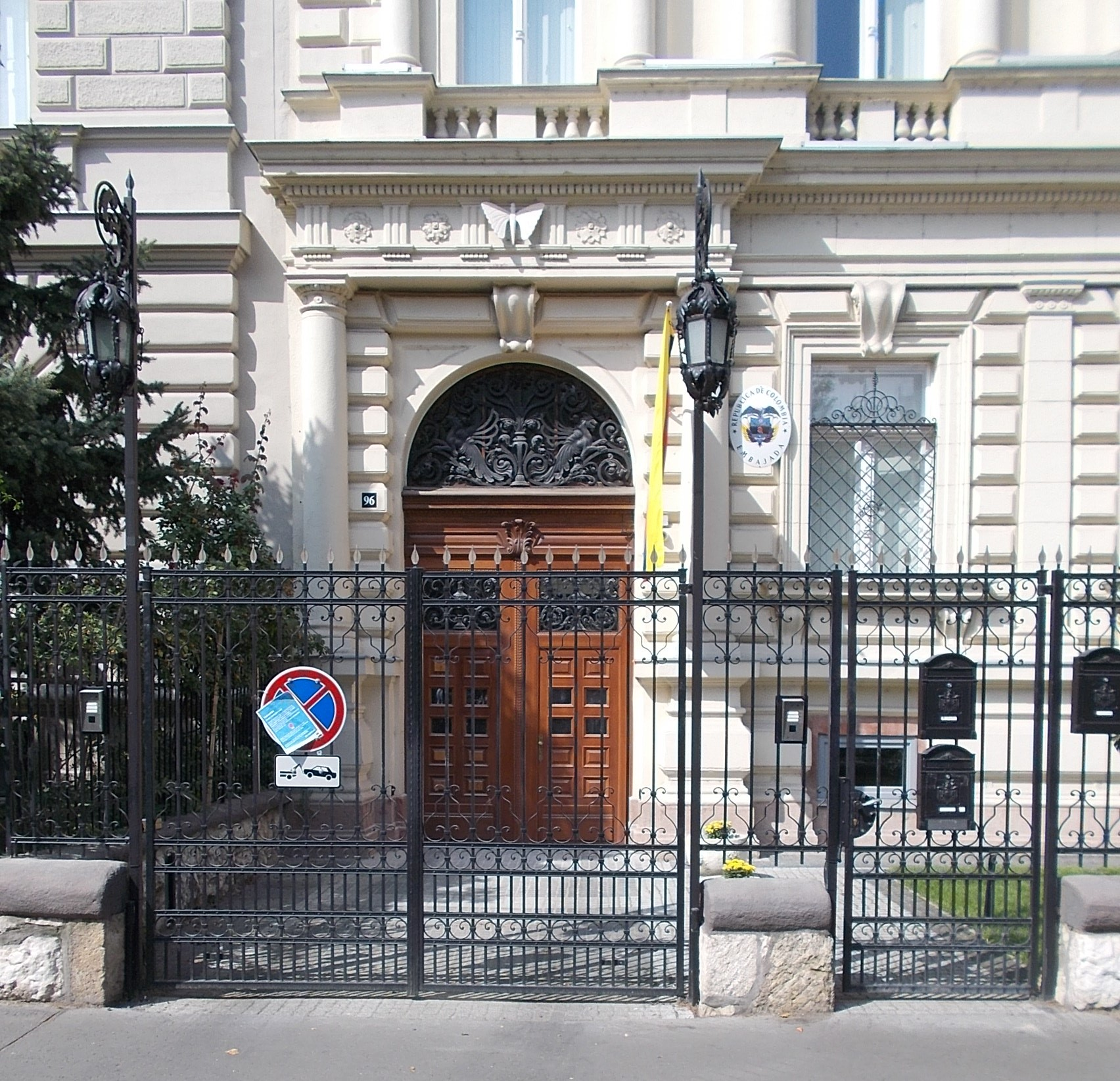
Embassy in Budapest

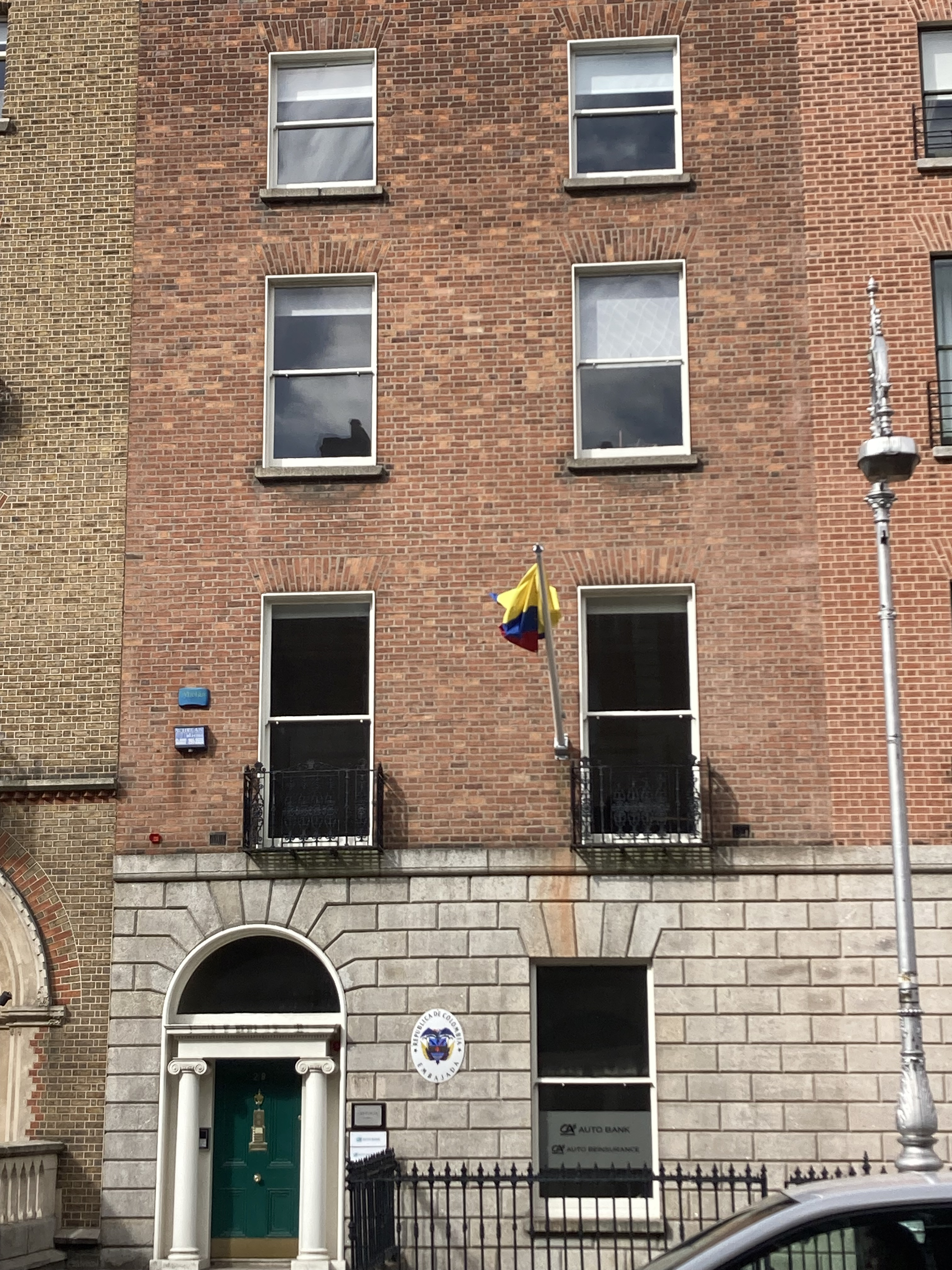
Embassy in Dublin

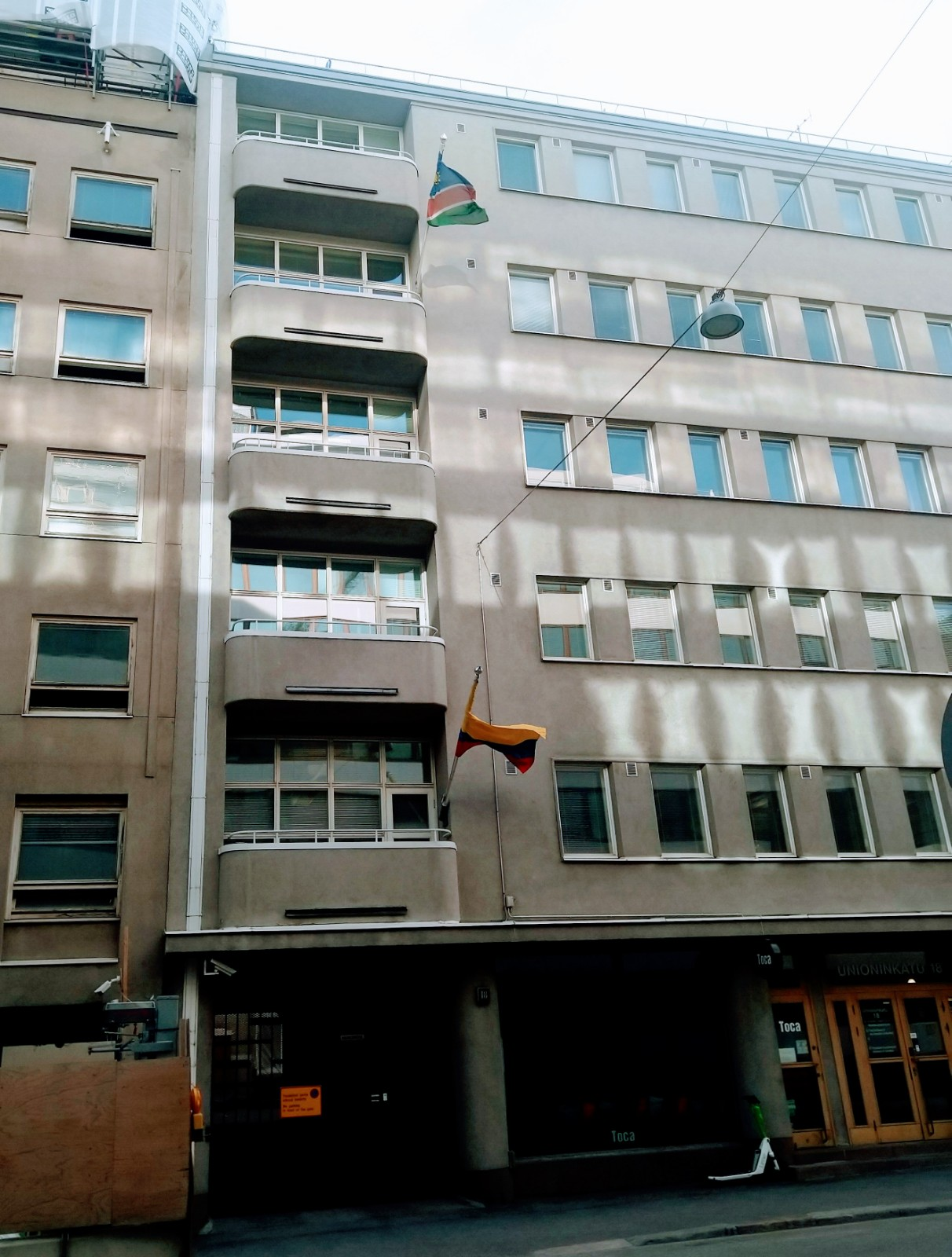
Building hosting the Embassy in Helsinki

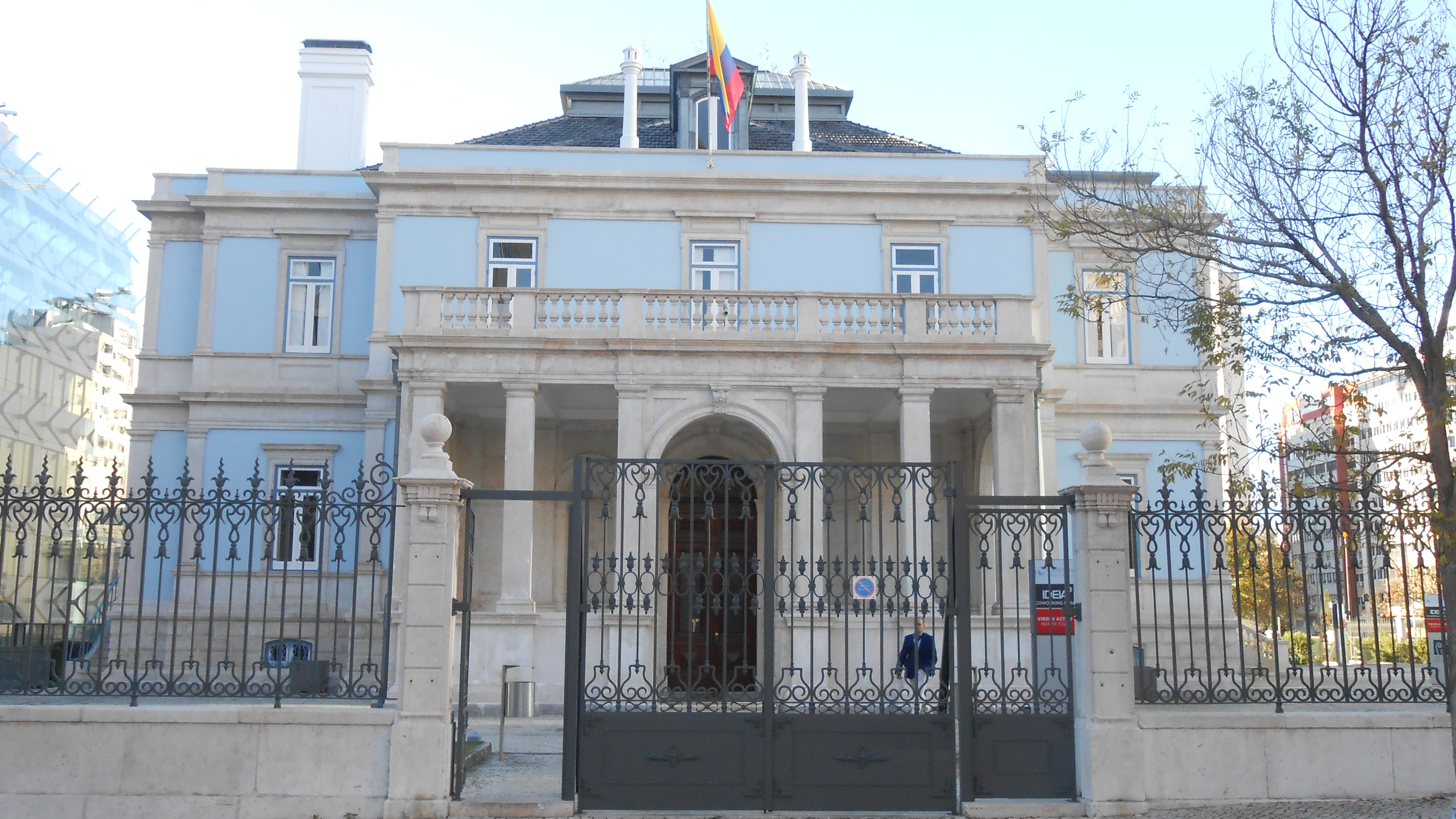
Embassy in Lisbon

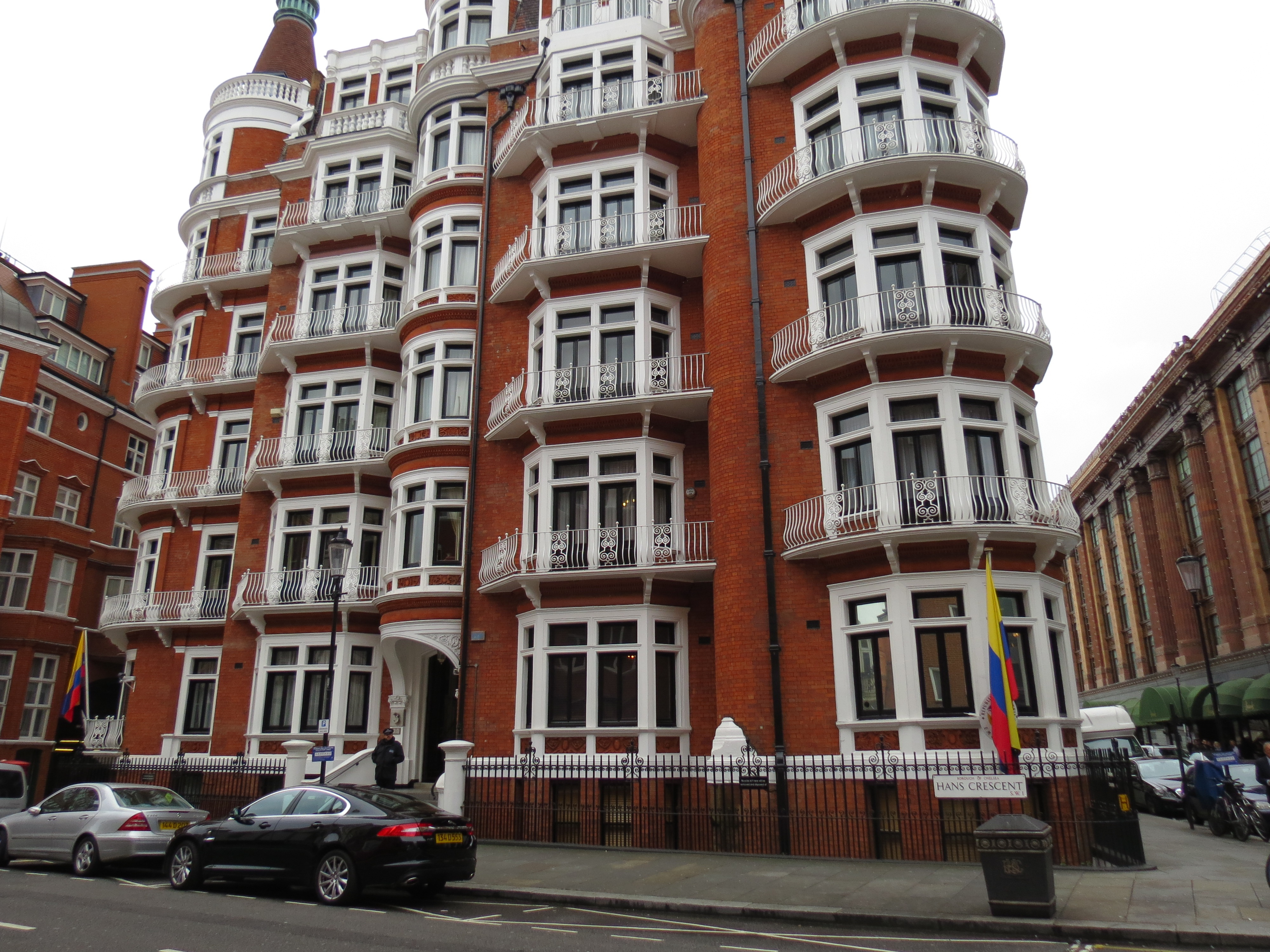
Embassy in London

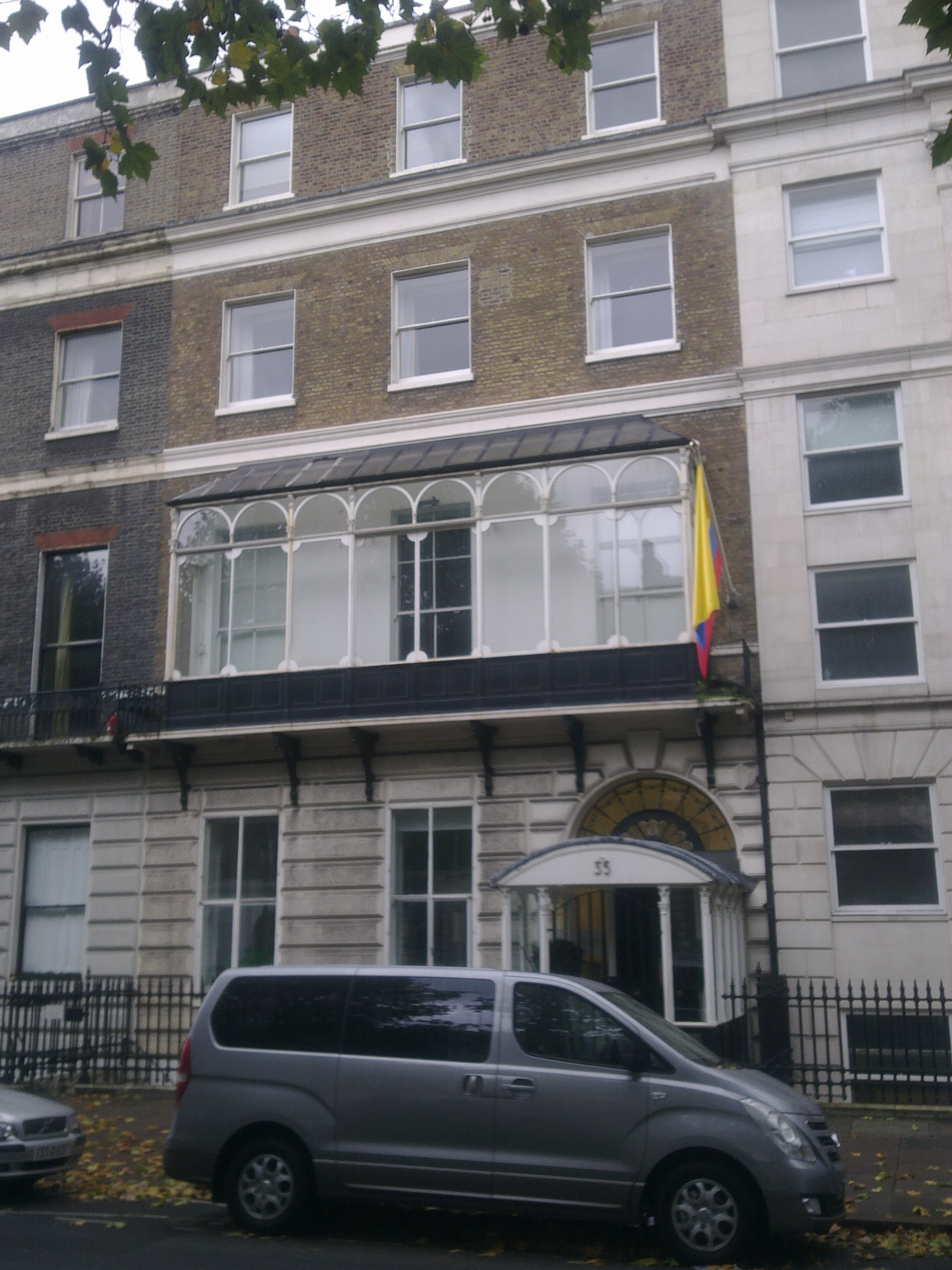
Consulate-General in London

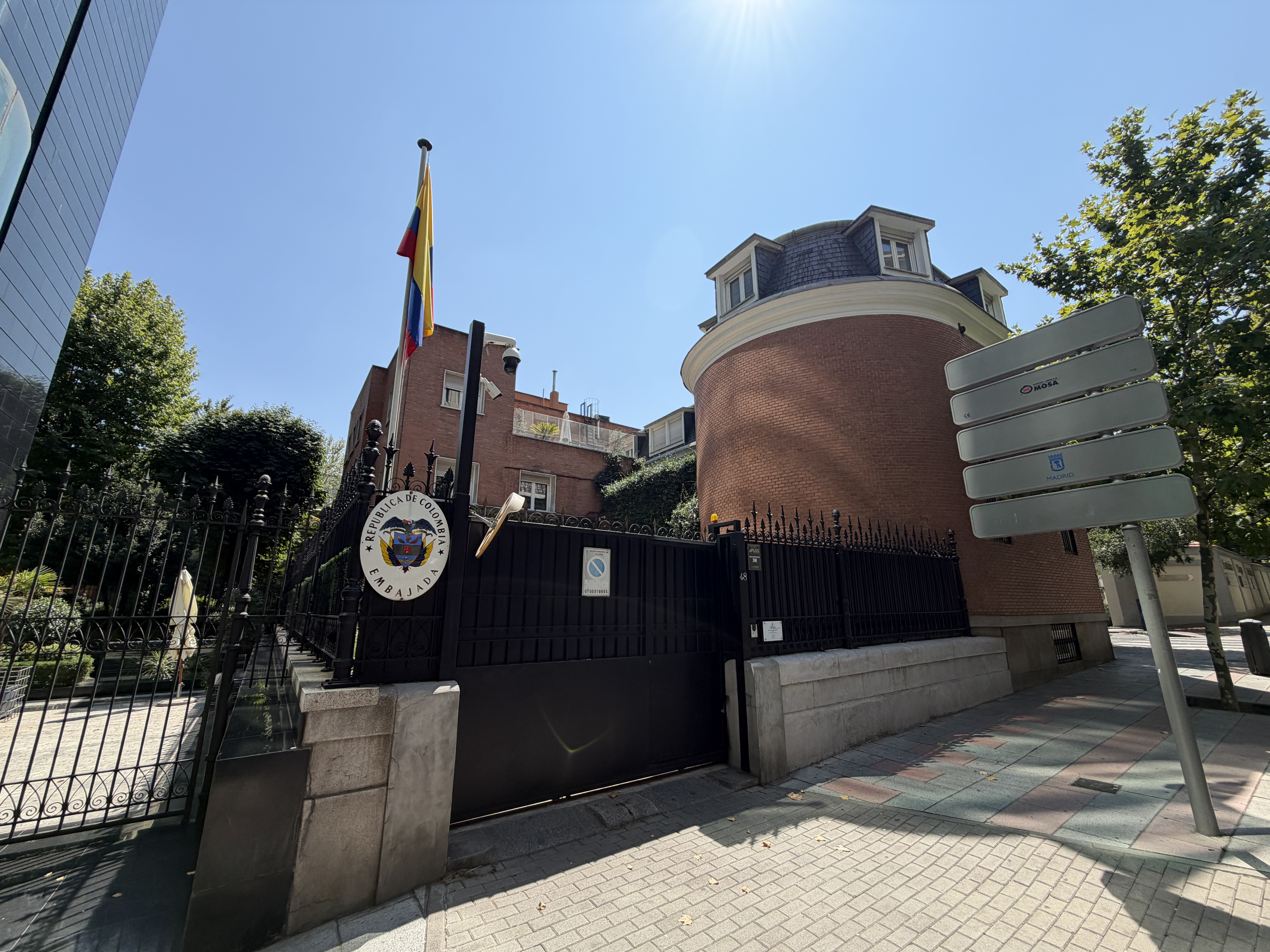
Embassy in Madrid

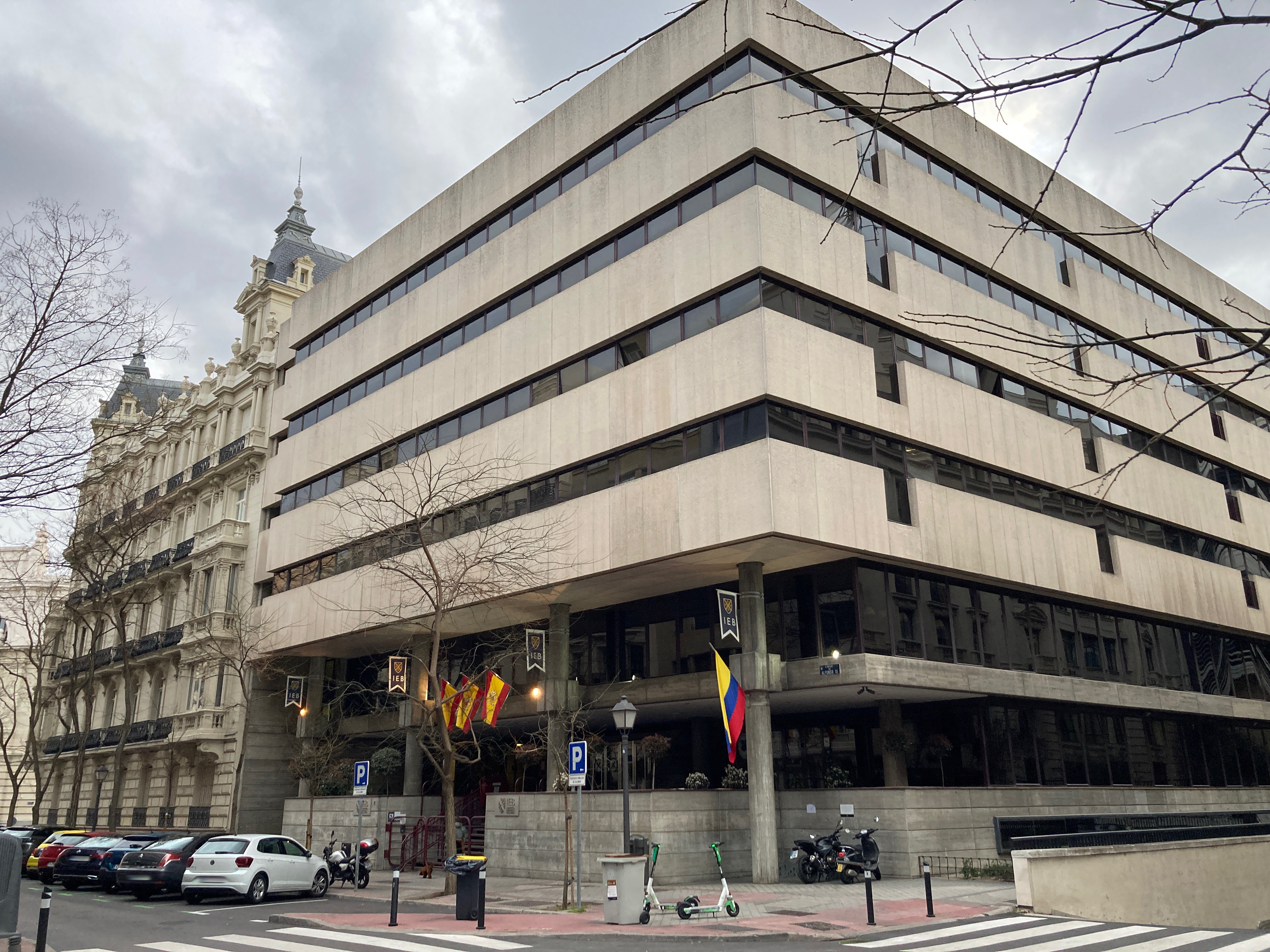
Consulate-General in Madrid

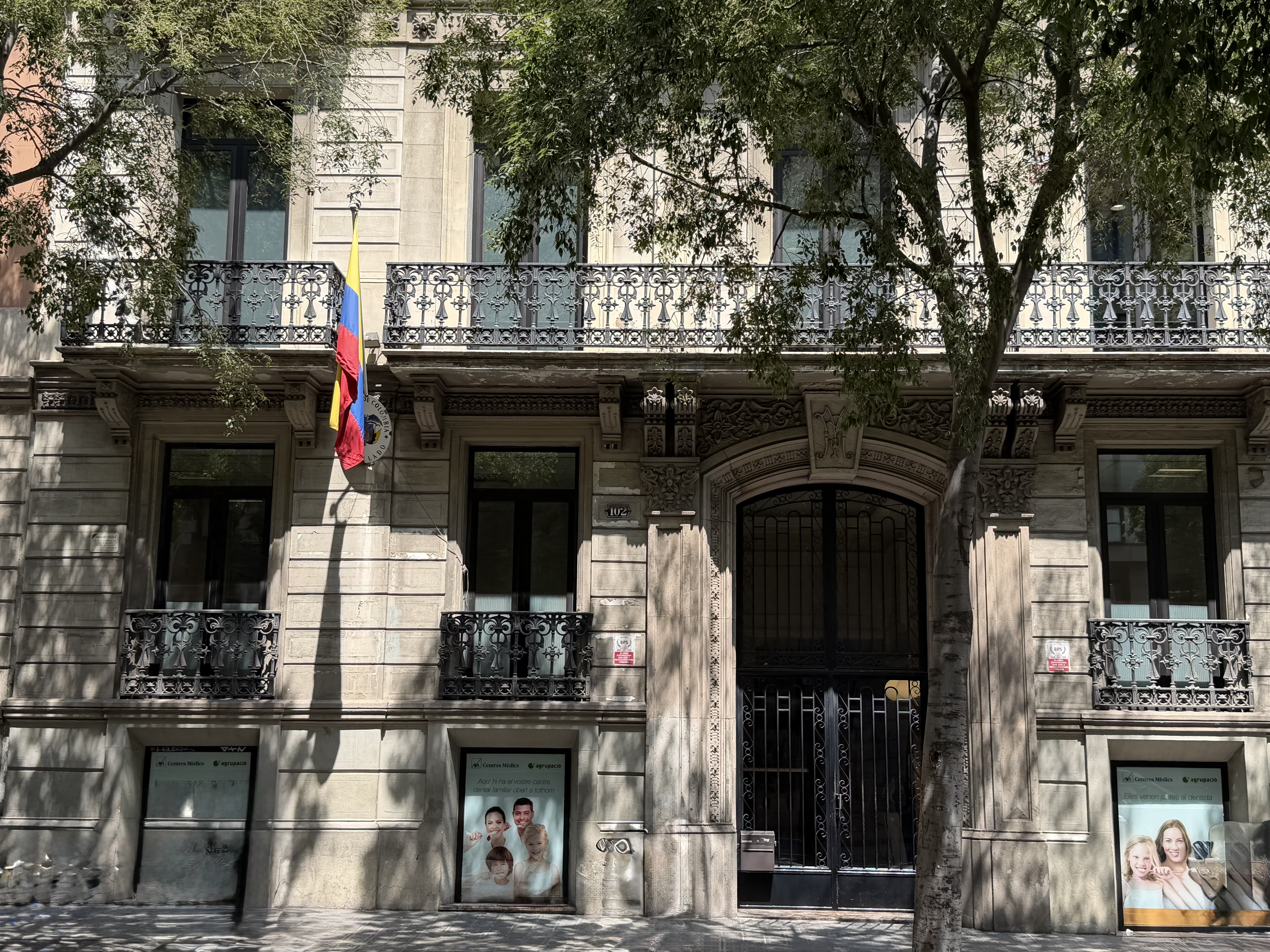
Consulate-General in Barcelona

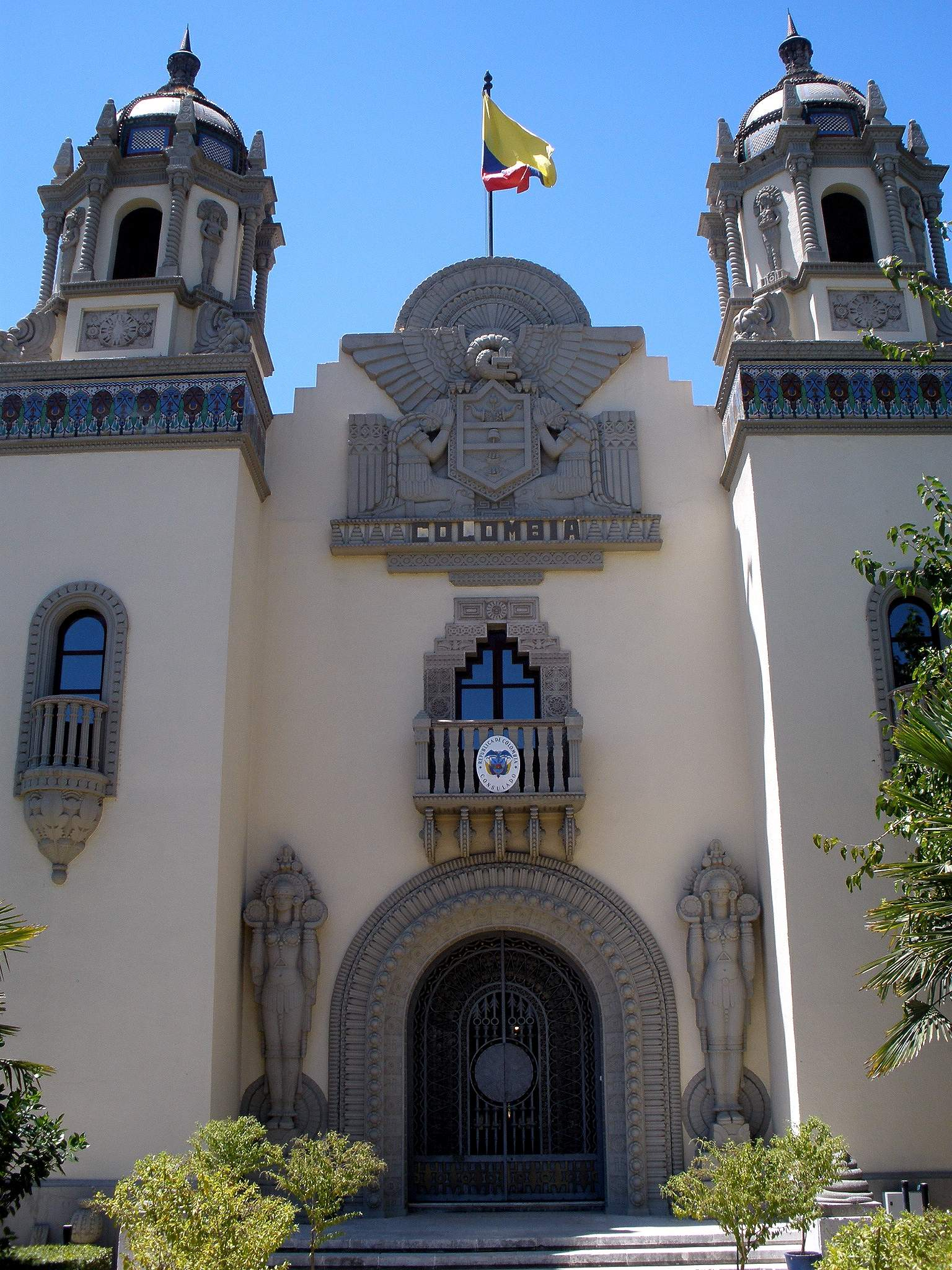
Consulate-General in Seville

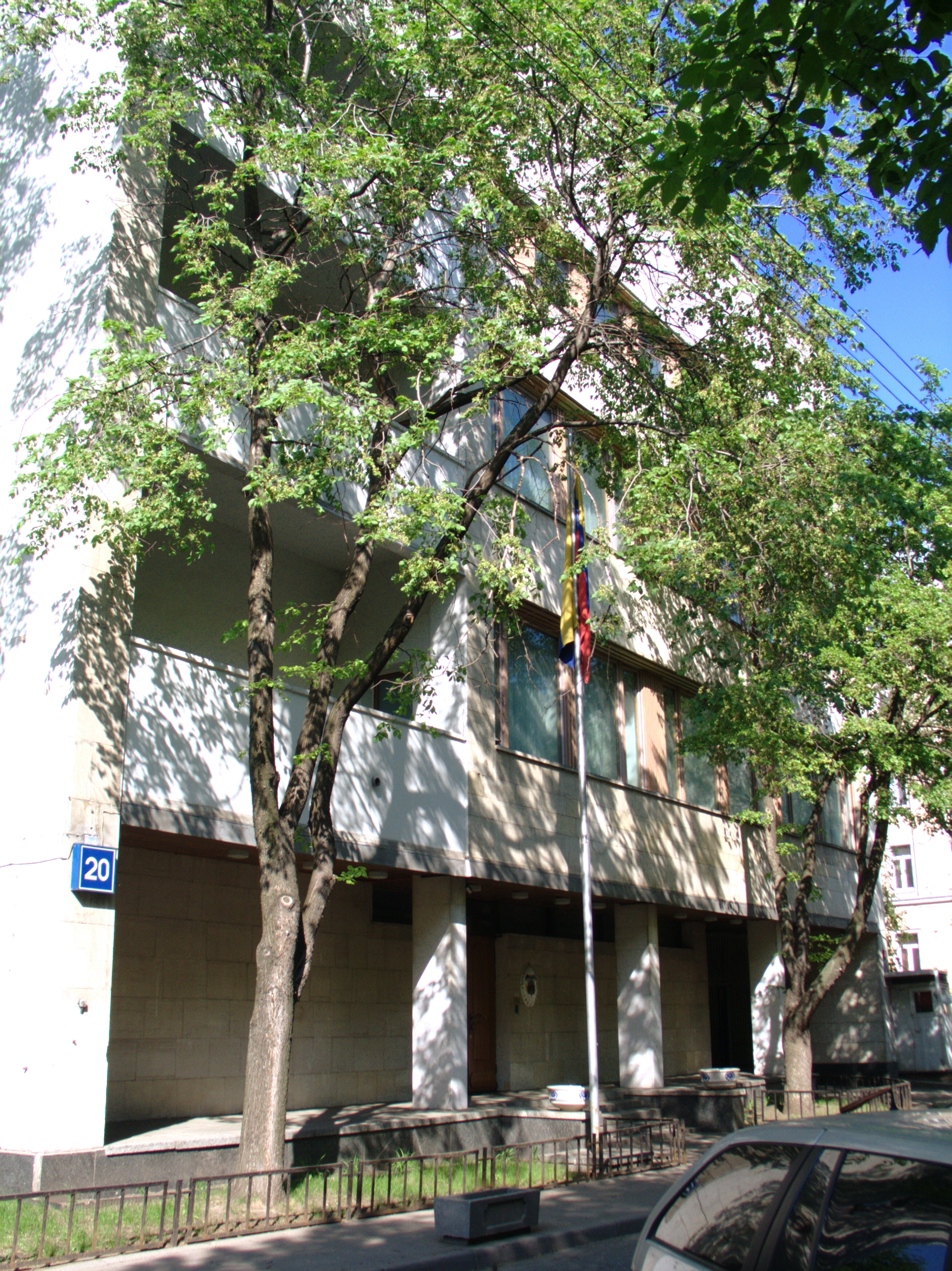
Embassy in Moscow

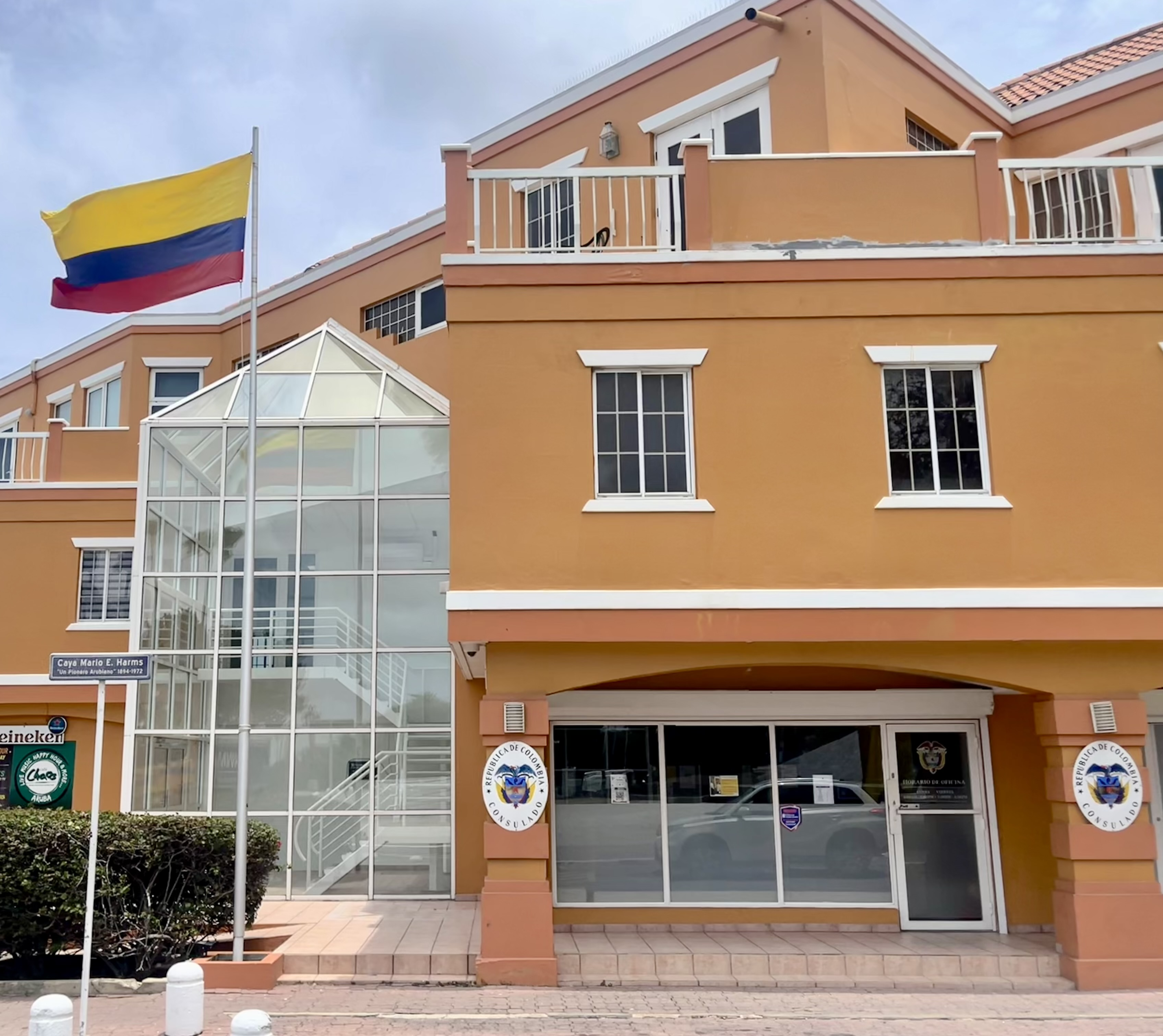
Consulate in Oranjestad

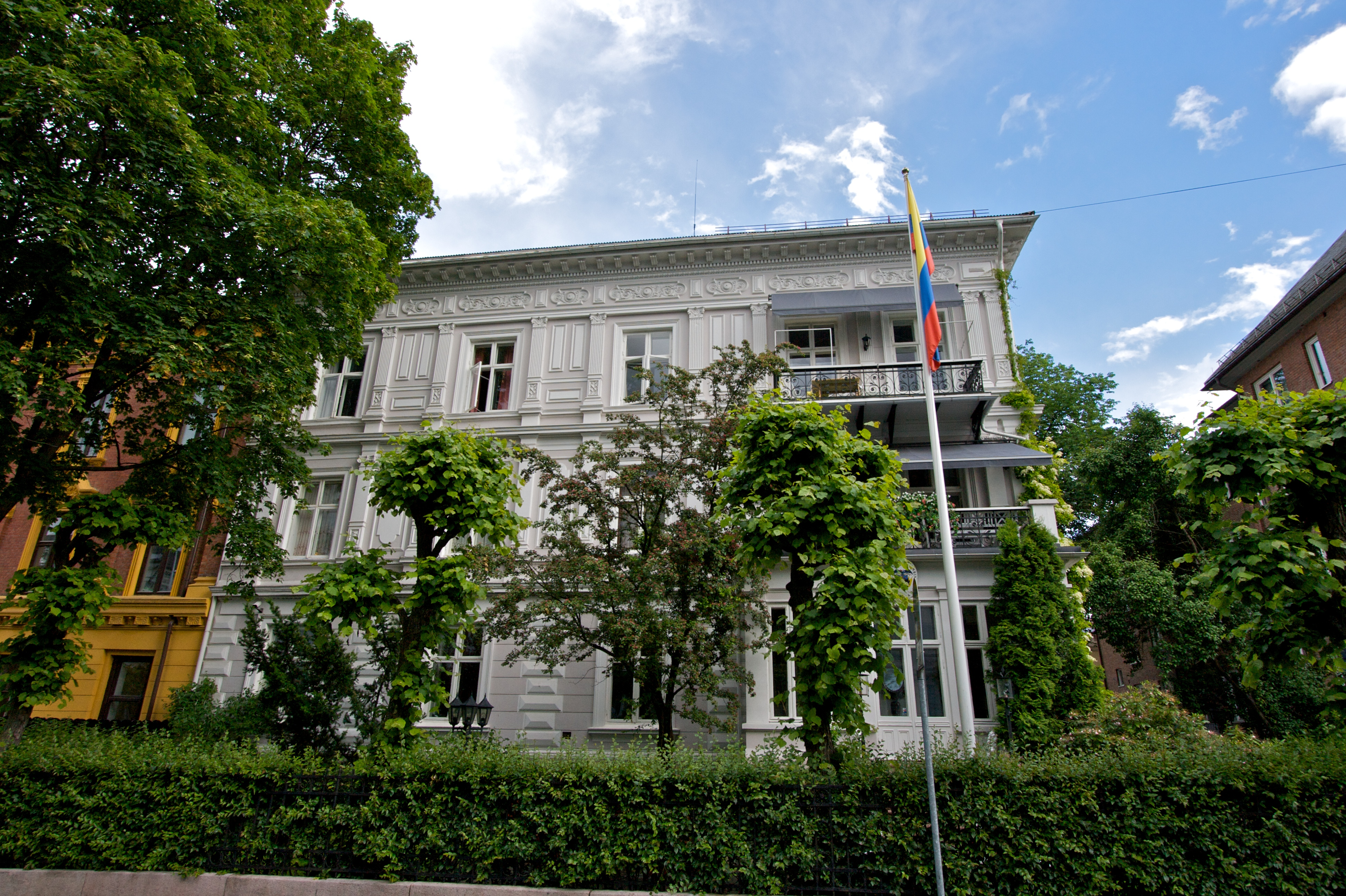
Embassy in Oslo

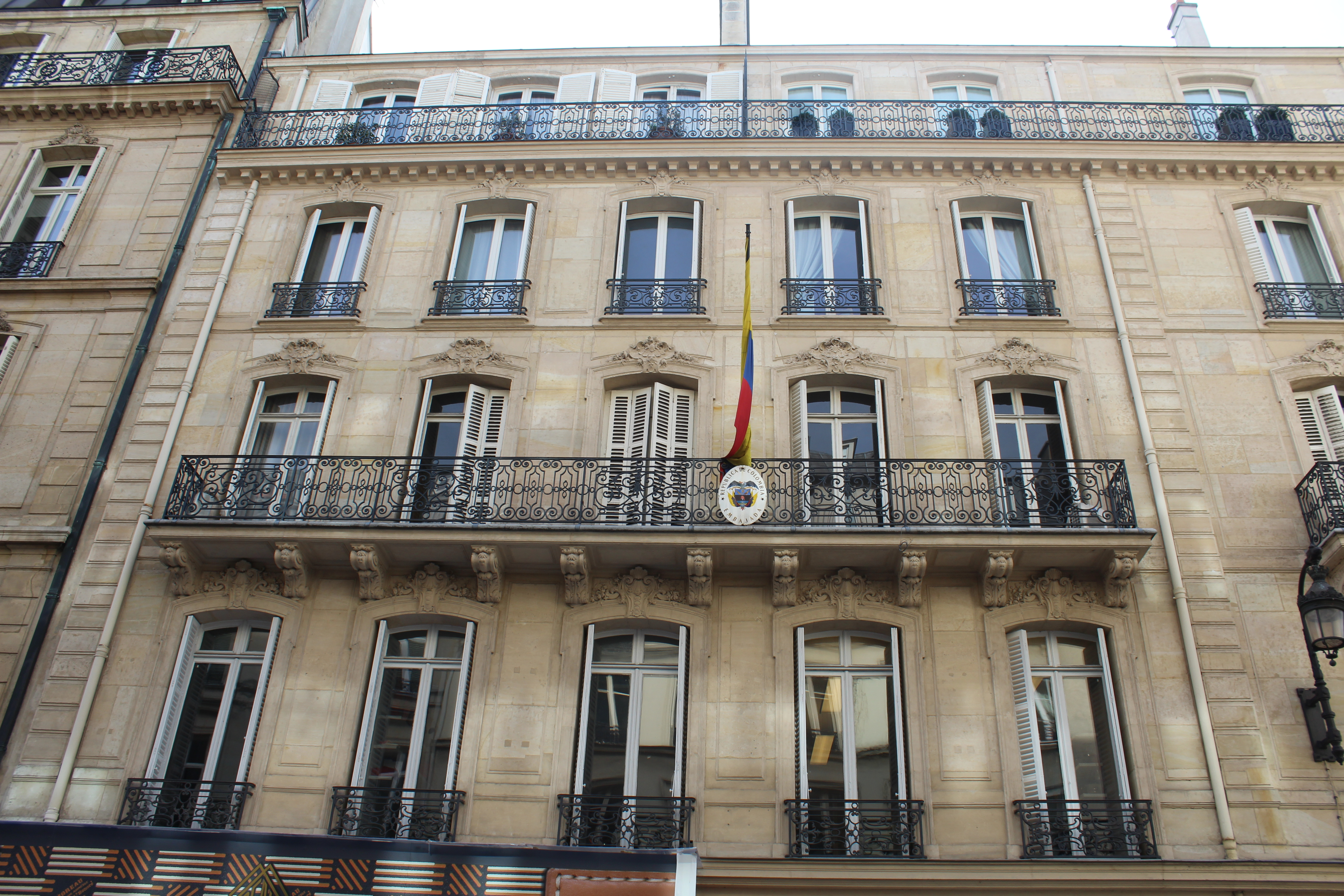
Embassy in Paris

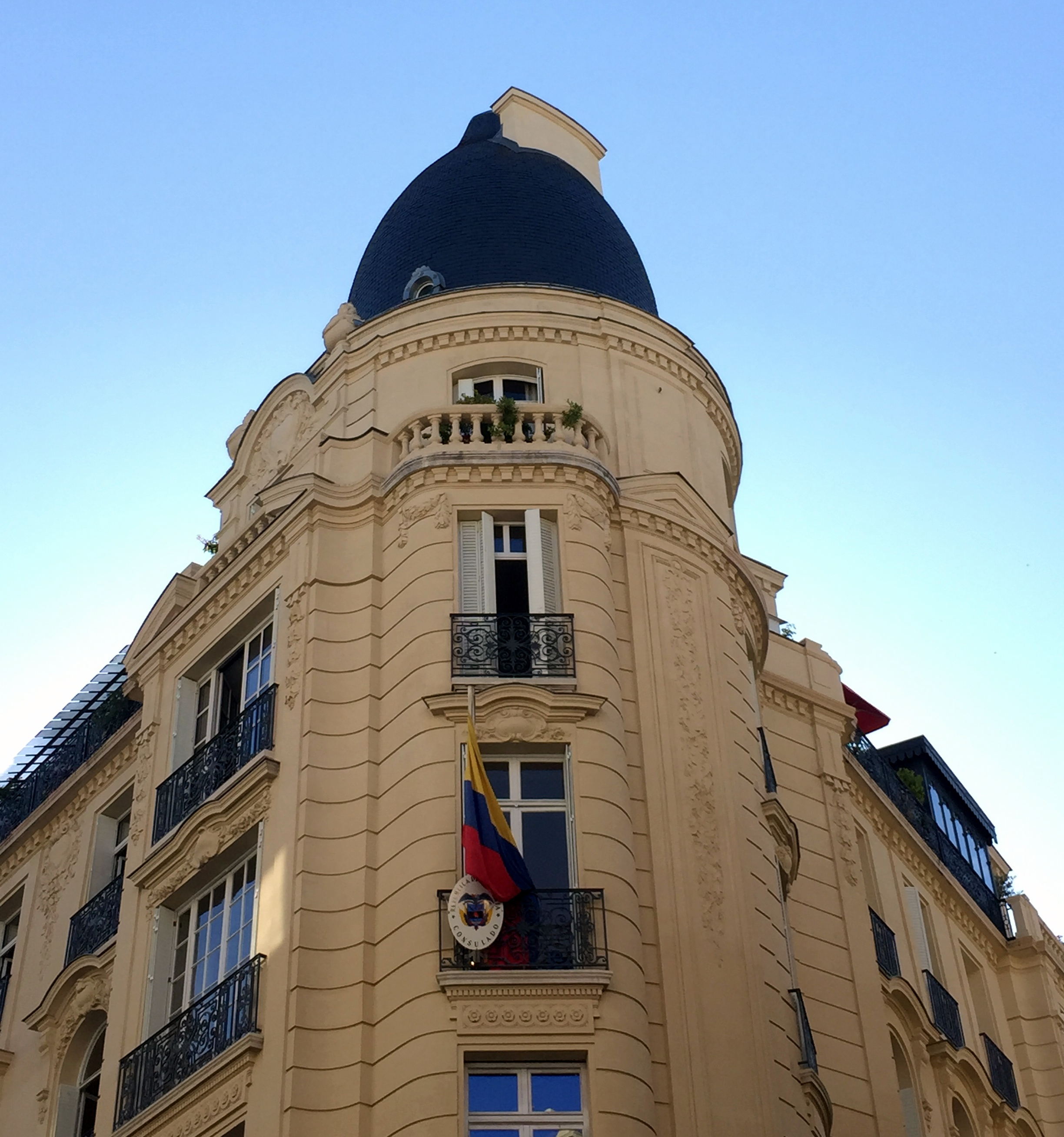
Consulate-General in Paris

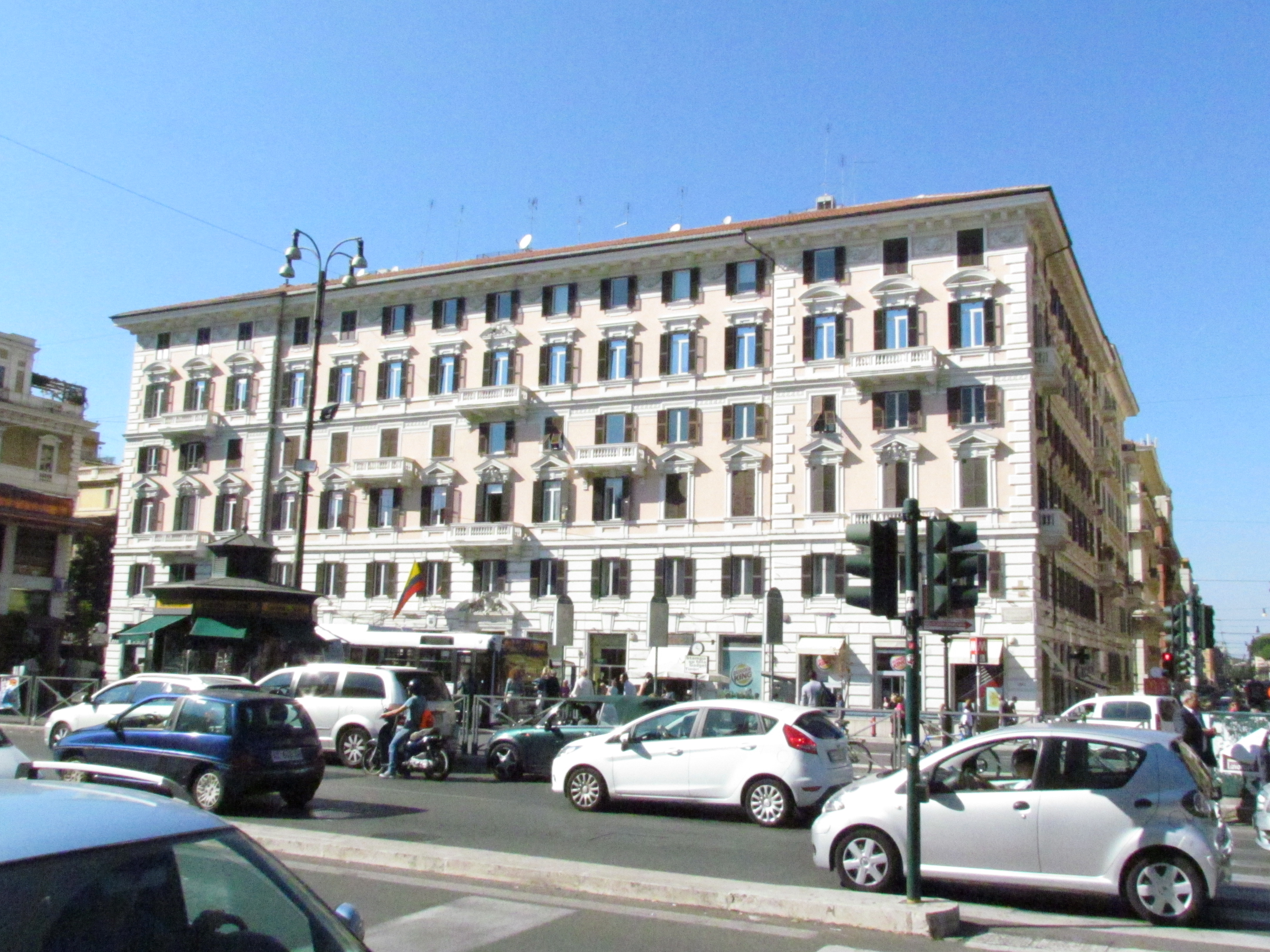
Consulate-General in Rome

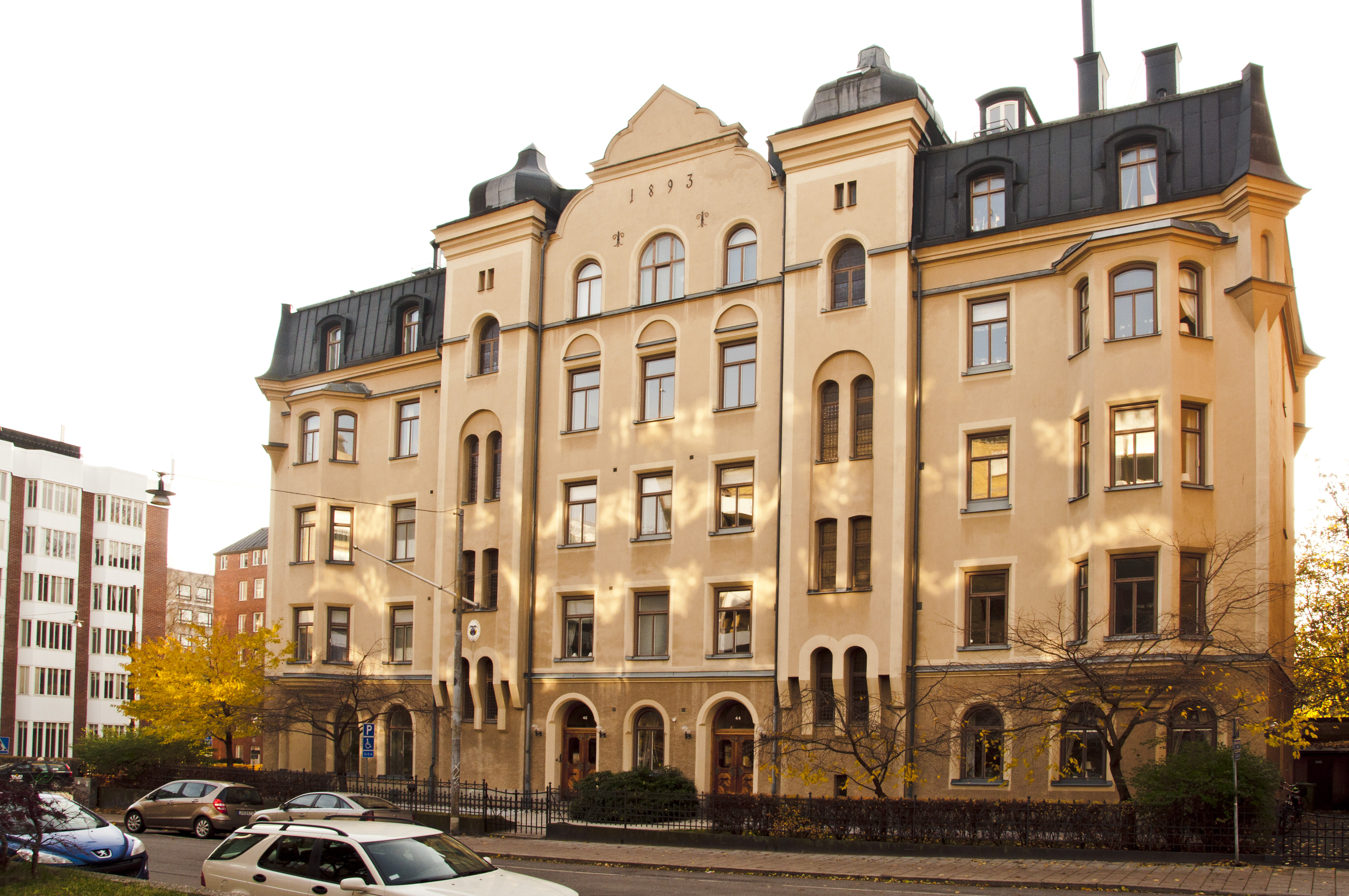
Embassy in Stockholm

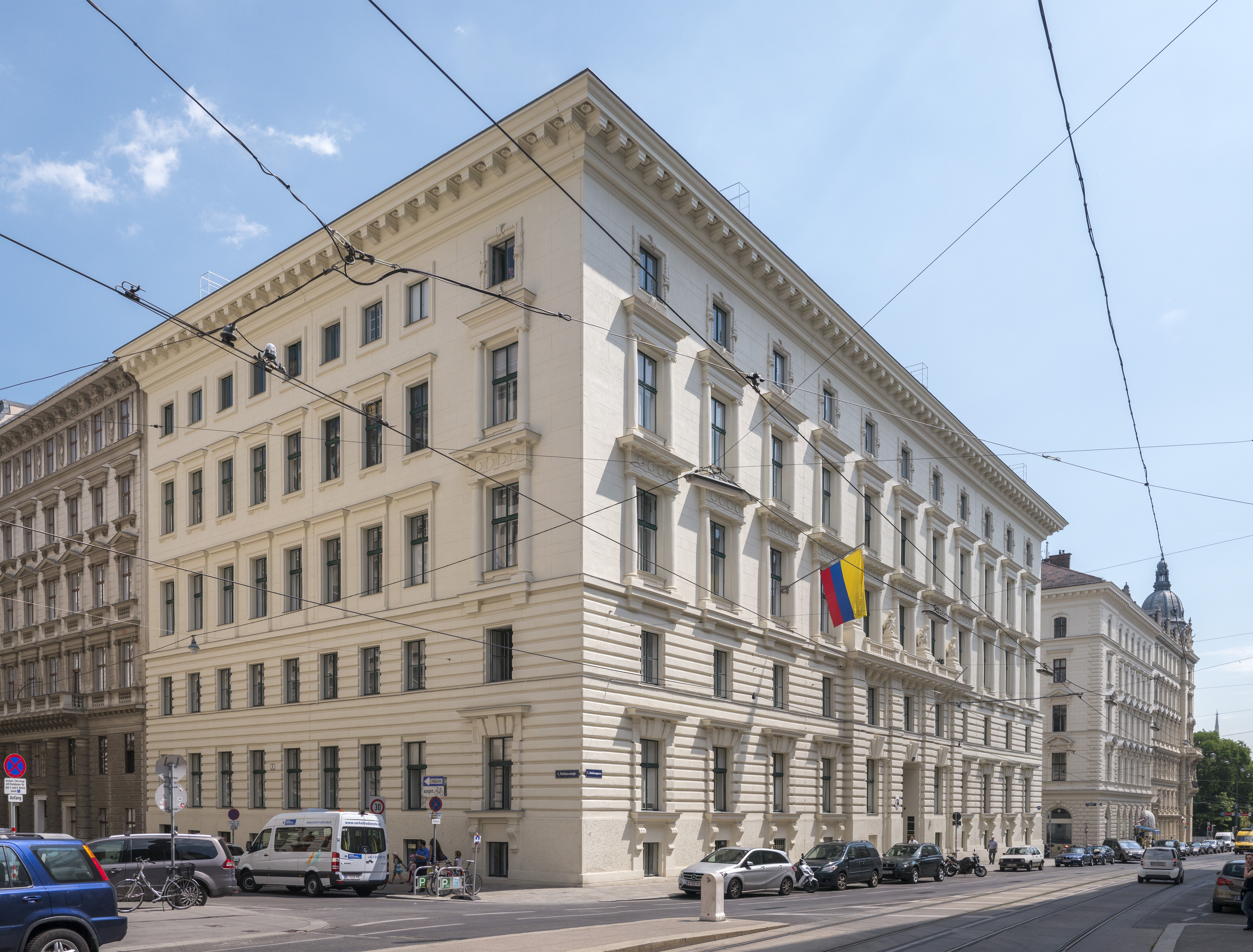
Embassy in Vienna

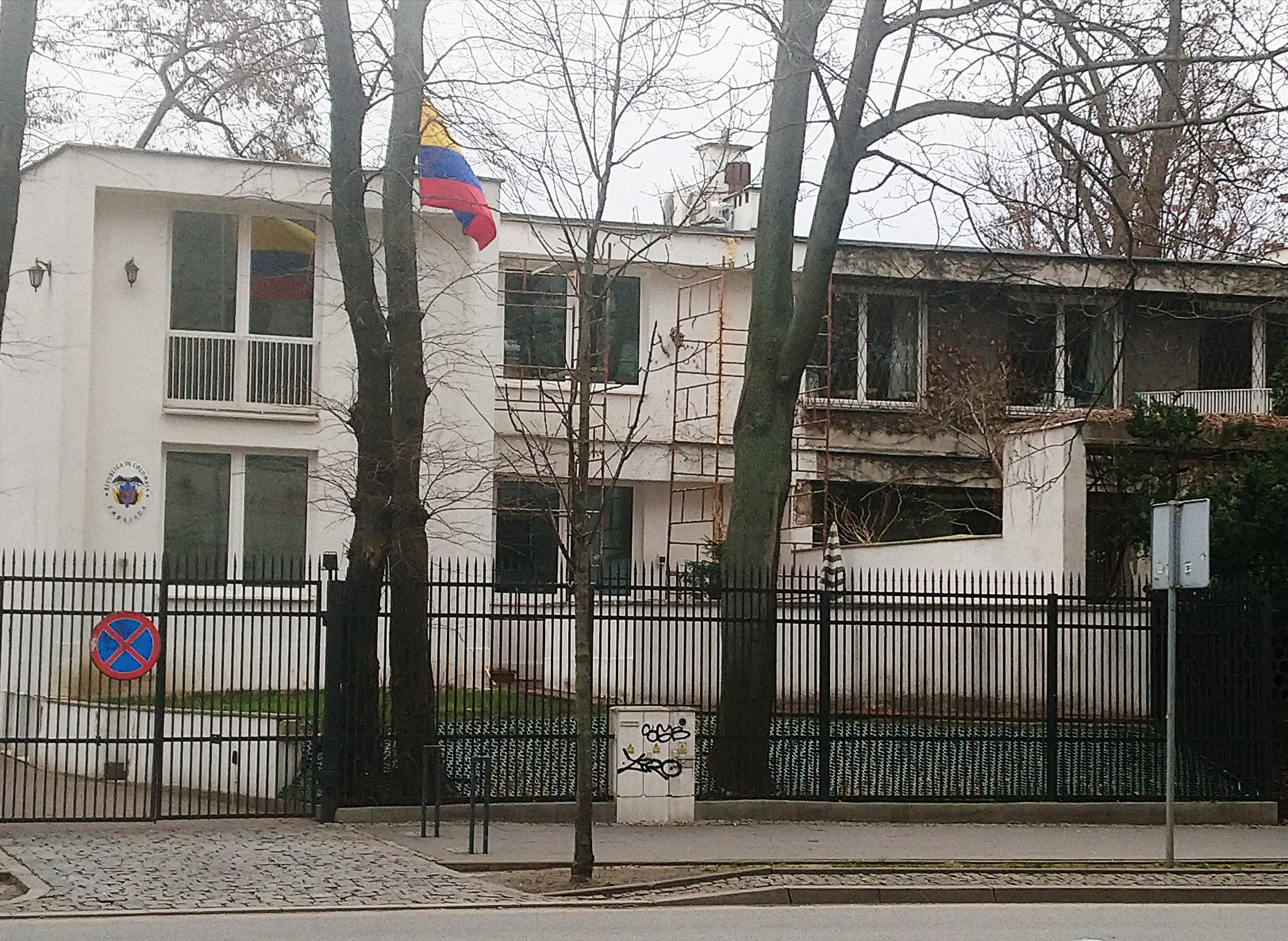
Embassy in Warsaw

=== Oceania ===
Host country	Host city	Mission	Concurrent accreditation	Ref.
Australia	Canberra	Embassy	Countries: Kiribati; Nauru; Papua New Guinea; Solomon Islands; Tuvalu; Vanuatu	
Australia	Sydney	Consulate-General	Countries: Kiribati; Nauru; Papua New Guinea; Solomon Islands; Tuvalu; Vanuatu	
New Zealand	Wellington	Embassy	Countries: Fiji; Samoa; Tonga	
New Zealand	Auckland	Consulate-General	Countries: Fiji; Samoa; Tonga	

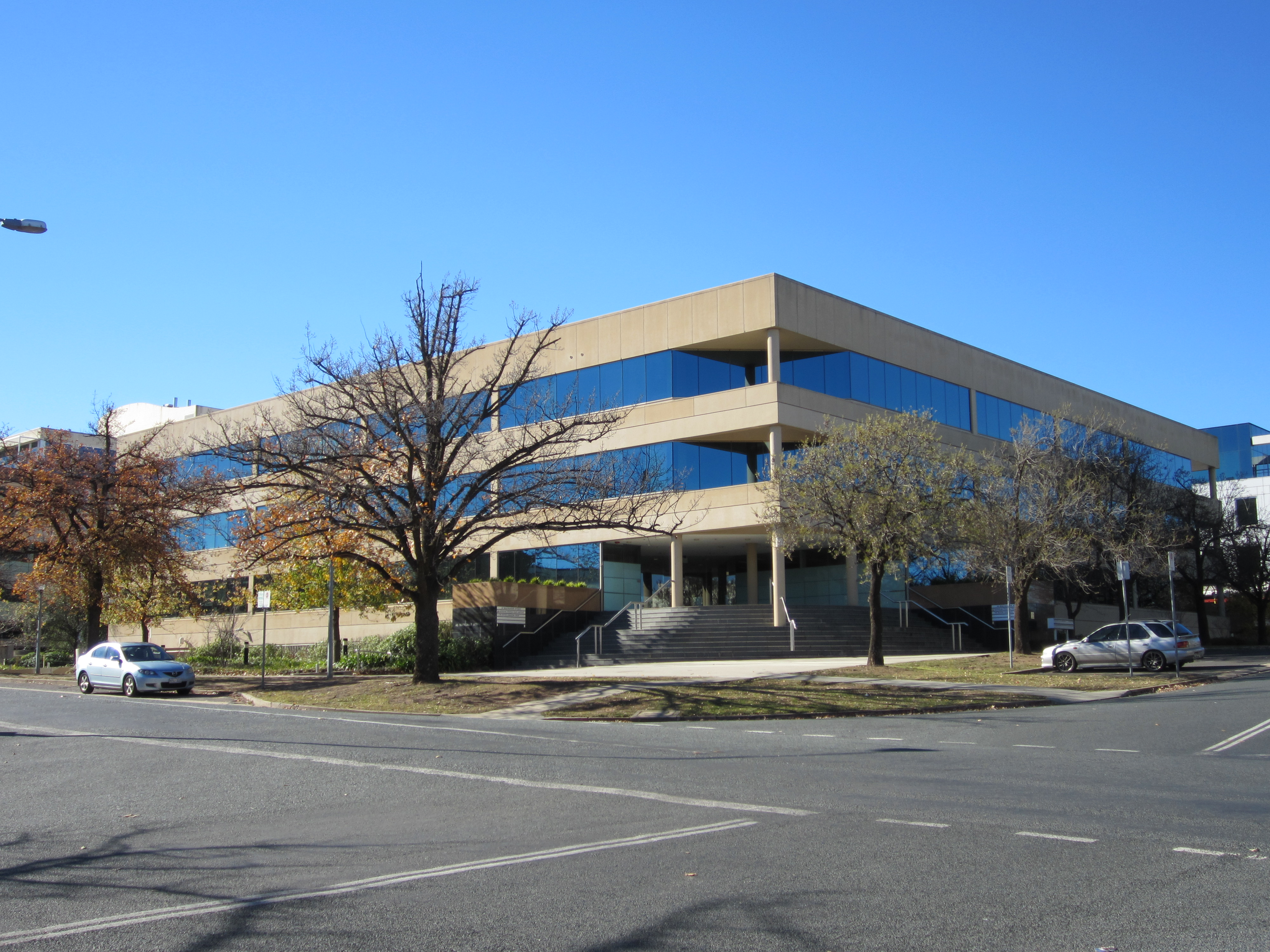
Building hosting the Embassy in Canberra

=== Multilateral organizations ===
Organization	Host city	Host country	Mission	Concurrent accreditation	Ref.
Food and Agriculture Organization	Rome	Italy	Permanent Mission	International Organizations: International Fund for Agricultural Development; World Food Programme	
Organization of American States	Washington, D.C.	United States	Permanent Mission		
OECD	Paris	France	Permanent Mission		
United Nations	New York City	United States	Permanent Mission		
United Nations	Geneva	Switzerland	Permanent Mission	International Organizations: Conference on Disarmament; International Organization for Migration; World Health Organization; World Intellectual Property Organization; World Trade Organization	
UNESCO	Paris	France	Permanent Mission		

== Closed missions ==
=== Americas ===
Host country	Host city	Mission	Year closed	Ref.
Belize	Belize City	Embassy	2002	
Brazil	Belém	Consulate	1987	
Ecuador	Cuenca	Consulate	2002	
Mexico	Monterrey	Consulate	2002	
Nicaragua	Bluefields	Consulate	1999	
United States	Baltimore	Consulate	1987	
United States	Detroit	Consulate	1994	
United States	Fort Lauderdale	Consulate	1988	
United States	New Orleans	Consulate-General	2002	
United States	Philadelphia	Consulate	1987	
United States	Seattle	Consulate	1922	
United States	Tampa	Consulate	1990	
Venezuela	Barinas	Consulate	2019	
Venezuela	El Amparo	Consulate (Note: In reopening process, following the restoration of relations with Venezuela)	2019	
Venezuela	Machiques	Consulate	2019	
Venezuela	Mérida	Consulate	2019	
Venezuela	Puerto Ayacucho	Consulate	2019	
Venezuela	San Carlos de Zulia	Consulate	2019	
Venezuela	San Fernando de Atabapo	Consulate	2019	
Venezuela	Valencia	Consulate	2019	

=== Asia ===
Host country	Host city	Mission	Year closed	Ref.
Republic of China (Taiwan)	Taipei	Trade Office	2002	
Iran	Tehran	Embassy	2002	

=== Europe ===
Host country	Host city	Mission	Year closed	Ref.
Bulgaria	Sofia	Embassy	1999	
East Germany (Note: Colombia closed its embassy in East Berlin upon the reunification of Germany in 1990, which saw the dissolution of the Democratic Republic of Germany.)	East Berlin	Embassy	1990	
France	Le Havre	Consulate	1988	
France	Marseille	Consulate	1988	
Germany	Bonn	Consulate-General	2002	
Germany	Hamburg	Consulate-General	2002	
Germany	Munich	Consulate-General	2002	
Greece	Athens	Embassy	2002	
Italy	Genoa	Consulate-General	1990	
Sweden	Gothenburg	Consulate	1988	
United Kingdom	Liverpool	Consulate-General	1988	

== Mission to open ==
Host country	Host city	Mission	Ref.
Nigeria	Abuja	Embassy	

== See also ==
- Foreign relations of Colombia
- List of diplomatic missions in Colombia
- Visa policy of Colombia
