= Asian Colombians =

Colombians of Asian descent

- (Colombia) (China) (Hong Kong) (Macau) (Taiwan) (Vietnam) (Syria) (Indonesia) (Pakistan) (Cambodia) (Thailand) (Timor-Leste) (Laos) (Saudi Arabia) (United Arab Emirates) (Japan) (North Korea) (South Korea) (Philippines) (India) (Afghanistan) (Bangladesh) (Palestine) (Turkey) (Lebanon) (Mongolia)
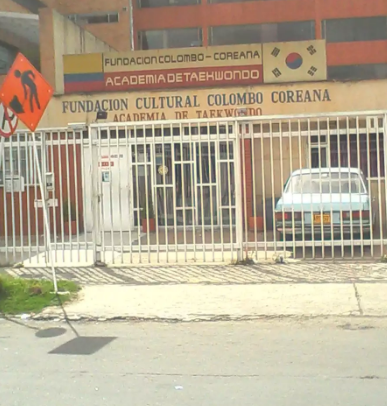
- Korean-Colombian Cultural Foundation in Bogota, Colombia

Total population
- 200,000 (2023, est.)

Regions with significant populations
- Bogotá, Barranquilla, Cali, Cartagena, Medellín, Santa Marta, Neiva, Manizales, Cúcuta, Pereira

Languages
- Colombian Spanish, Chinese, Japanese, Korean, Languages in India, Arabic, Vietnamese, Armenian, Turkish, Thai, Filipino, Malay.

Religion
- Buddhism, Catholicism, Hinduism, Islam, Protestantism, Shintoism, Sikhism

Related ethnic groups
- Asians, Arabs, Colombians, Arab Colombians

Asian Colombians (Spanish: colombianos asiáticos; Latin American Spanish: [/kolombjanos/ /aˈsjatikos/]) are Asian immigrants in Colombia and their descendants. The majority of Asian Colombians are of Chinese and Japanese descent, with a smaller portion being of Korean descent. There are also notable South Asian, Southeast Asian, Arab, and Middle Eastern descending populations.

A study by Latinobarómetro in 2023 estimated that 0.4% of Colombians are Asian, this would equate to around 200,000 of Colombia's population of approximately 50 million people.

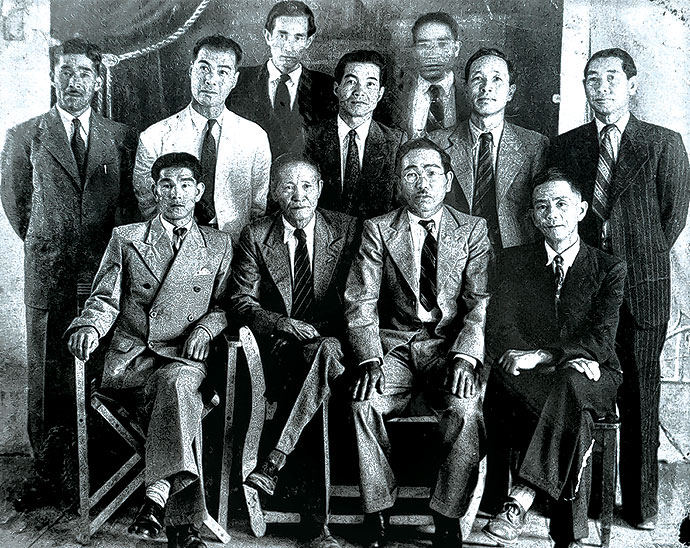
Immigrants from Japan in Palmira (date unknown)

== History ==
=== Panama Canal Railway ===
In 1854, many Chinese migrants arrived in Colombian territory for the construction of the Panama Canal Railway across the Isthmus of Panama, as the domestic labor force was insufficient. Around 705 Chinese immigrants came to Panama from Guandong province to work on the railway after demonstrating their skills working on the construction of the first Transcontinental Railroad on the west coast of the United States. The Chinese migrants being brought into both projects were a desperate measure by the managers of the railway companies, who did not have enough workers among the native population for the construction and failed to import enough Irish, German, and other European migrants to make up for the deficit.

=== Sugar industry ===
At the beginning of the 20th century, Indian Muslim migrants settled in the towns of the Cauca River valley, some just temporarily and others permanently, to engage in the commercial activity demanded by the new working population of the nascent sugar industry. These immigrants brought a variety of products to rural areas, both granting credit and accepting barter.

=== Panamanian independence ===
Toraji Irie, a renowned Japanese writer, states in his work on Japanese migration to other regions of the World that the first Japanese migrants who arrived in Colombia in 1903, the year Panama gained independence and Colombia lost control of the Isthmus of Panama, came as a result of the Colombian Government seeking help from Japan in hiring workers to guard land bordering Panama against U.S. incursions.

In 1928, this was the smallest migratory group, being somewhat small compared to other South American countries like Brazil, Peru or Venezuela. Despite this, some Japanese families began settling in Valle del Cauca, where many became farmers.

=== Late 20th century ===
Between 1970 and 1980, there was a small yet constant flow of Asian migration (mainly from China) into Colombian cities, primarily Bogotá, Barranquilla, Cali, Cartagena, Medellín, Santa Marta, Neiva, Manizales, Cúcuta and Pereira, which continues to this day. Other very small groups of Asian migrants came from India, Indonesia, Pakistan and the Philippines.

Between 1970 and 1980 there were more than 6,000 Chinese Immigrants in Colombia, as they continued to arrive and grow in population. Anti-Immigration policies in many other countries is a possible factor in continued Chinese immigration into Colombia. Emigration out of China into Colombia generally did not occur in the first three decades following the establishment of the People's Republic of China, as emigration was restricted. Due to Xenophobia and Sinophobia within the United States, a significant amount of Chinese people chose to immigrate into other countries, including Colombia.

== Arab ==
Most Arab Colombians are of Lebanese, Syrian and Palestinian origins, largely emigrating from the Ottoman Empire in the late 19th century. Many of them settled in cities like Barranquilla and Maicao. The total population of Colombians of Middle Eastern descent was put at 3.2 million by the National Administrative Department of Statistics (DANE).

As the Arab population in Colombia grows, so does its Muslim community. From 2007 to 2023, Bogotá went from having 1 mosque to 6.

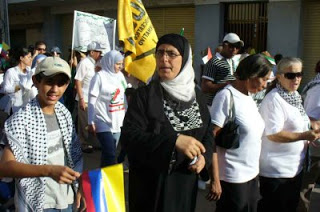
Lebanese Colombians in Maicao (2014)

=== Lebanese ===
Colombia has the third-largest Lebanese population abroad below only Argentina and Brazil, with an estimated population of between 1,200,000 and 2,500,000 people. Between 1880 and 1930, it is estimated 10,000 to 30,000 Lebanese migrants relocated to Colombia.

=== Palestinian ===
According to a 2025 article by Raúl Zibechi for The North American Congress on Latin America, there were 100,000 Palestinians in Colombia. Approximate estimations by the Embassy of Palestine in Bogotá were between 100,000 and 120,000 people in 2019, this included first, second, third, and fourth generation Palestinian immigrants.

=== Syrian ===
Most Syrian Colombians came to Colombia in the late 19th and early 20th century, with notable populations in Córdoba, Cartagena, and other cities.

== East Asian ==
=== Chinese ===
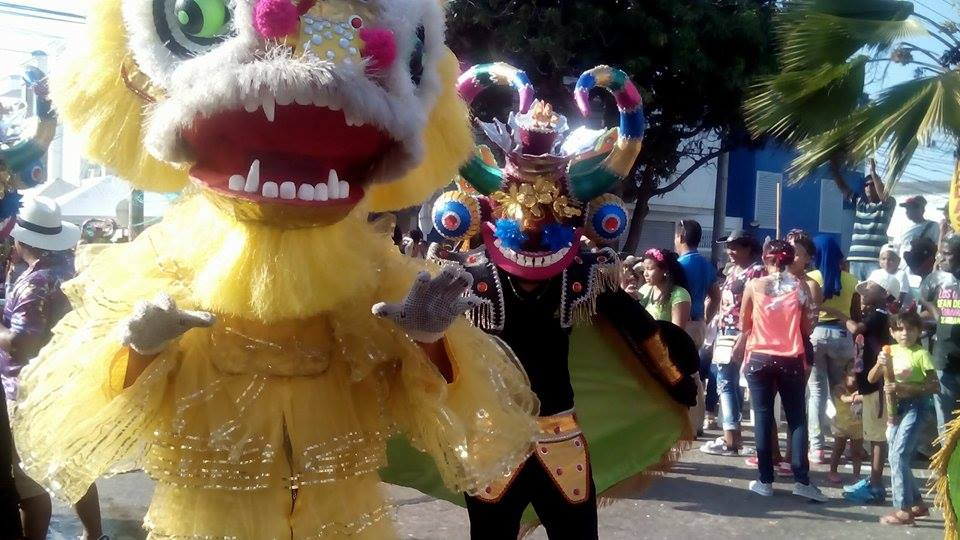
Chinese lion and dragon costumes at the 2016 Barranquilla Carnival

A large portion of Chinese emigration into Colombian in the 21st century has been composed of employees and business executives who have moved to Colombia following the multinational corporations they work for, some of which providing housing and accommodations for them directly. This has encouraged the development of ethnic enclaves in cities that welcome multinational corporations, such as Medellín, Barranquilla, and Cali. While many Chinese resident workers are on temporary visas, the enclaves are established and composed of many permanent Chinese-Colombian residents and citizens. In 2014, it was estimated that there were 25,000 Chinese people living in Colombia. As of 2018, the Chinese embassy totaled around 20,000 Chinese citizens living in Colombian cities.

Due to Chinese immigration to Colombia, dishes such as arroz chino have become popular street food.

=== Japanese ===
According to the Ministry of Foreign Affairs of Japan, as of 2024, there were 1,315 Japanese nationals residing in Colombia and an estimated 3,100 "Japanese descendants".

== See also ==
- Immigration to Colombia
- Asian diaspora
- Race and ethnicity in Colombia
- Colombians
