= White Colombians =

Colombian descendants of European people

colombianos blancos (Spanish)
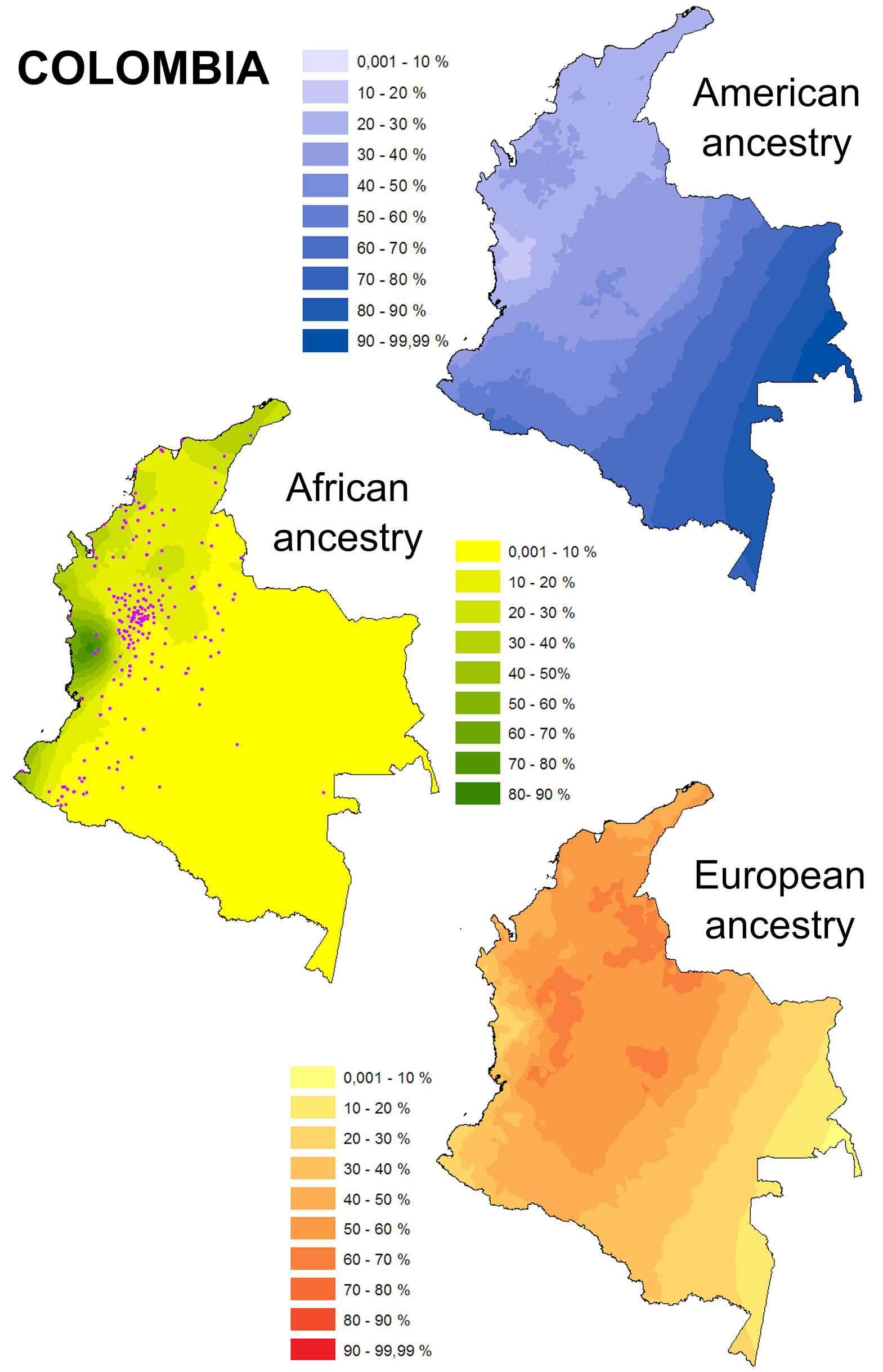
- Estimated proportion of the White Colombian population

Total population
- 30%–37% of the Colombian population

Regions with significant populations
- Entire country; highest percentages found in the Andean Region and the major cities

Languages
- Predominantly Spanish

Religion
- Christianity (Roman Catholic)

Related ethnic groups
- Europeans · West Asians; Mestizo Colombians · White Latin Americans

White Colombians (Spanish: colombianos blancos) are Colombians of completely or predominantly European or West Asian ancestry. The 2018 census of Colombia did not have a separate category for White or Mestizo people, but did for Indigenous and Afro-Colombians. 87.58% of Colombians did not identify with those, being either White or Mestizo (of mixed European and African/Indigenous ancestry).

== Prevalence ==
European ancestry in Colombia by department

While most sources estimate Whites to be 20% of the country's population, according to Latinobarómetro poll, 26% of Colombians surveyed self-identified as White.

White Colombians primarily live in the Andean Region and the urban centers. Most are of Spanish origin, but there is also a large population of Middle Eastern descendants, as well as some Italian, German, and other European ancestries.

== Genetics ==
Genetic ancestry of self-identified White Colombians according to Candela Project (2014).
1. European (65.0%)
2. Indigenous (26.0%)
3. African (9.00%)

According to research published in 2014, which evaluated the genetic pool of 1,659 Colombians living mostly in the city of Medellín, the average genetic makeup was 60% European, 29% Indigenous, and 11% African, with self-identified White Colombians (19.3% of the samples) being 65% European, 26% Indigenous, and 9% African.

Genetic composition in the department of Antioquia (second most populated department), according to a study published in Scientific Reports

Genetic composition in the department of Antioquia (Medellín) according to a study published in Scientific Reports.
1. European (75.0%)
2. Amerindian (18.0%)
3. African (7.00%)

== History ==
Before the arrival of Europeans, Indigenous peoples of Colombia populated the region.

=== Colonial era ===
The presence of Whites in Colombia began in 1510 with the colonization of San Sebastián de Urabá. Many Spaniards came searching for gold, while others established themselves locally as leaders of Christian social organizations.

== European ==
=== French ===
During the early 18th century, many French explorers traveled to the Caribbean coast of Colombia, called Urabá. At around 140 French registered as Protestants who undertook to grow cocoa beans. After a violent conflict between the European explorers and the indigenous, the survivors were able to flee from war and began settling in the department of Córdoba.

Some of the French veterans of the French Revolutionary Wars (1792 - 1802) and of the Grande Armée of Napoléon during the Napoleonic Wars (1803 - 1815) participated in the liberation armies, which was a mission of Jean Baptiste Boussingault arrived in Colombia in 1822. French zoologist François Désiré Roulin, signed a four-year contract to teach mineralogy and chemistry at the School of Mines, and to serve the role of mineralogist researcher and engineer of the mines of the Viceroyalty of New Granada.

In 1855, a group of French immigrants landed in Colombia that deeply impacted the history of mining in the Antioquia region during the second half of the 19th century. The members who worked in the mining were Count Adolphe de Gaisne de Bourmont, Adolphe and Paul de Bedout, Augustin de Colleville, Henri Brèche and Eugène Lutz. Bourmont bought in 1856 a part of the shares of the Titiribí smelting farm, which belonged to the English Tyrell Moore, and also of different mines located in the area. The collapse of most French agricultural, industrial or mining companies stand out, including the fruitless attempt by a French geographer Élisée Reclus, who installed a crop in Sierra Nevada de Santa Marta, or the French Sinu Company.

Until 1870, nearly all French immigrants to Colombia originated from the Pyrenees. French immigrants in Colombia came from Southwestern France, including Béarn, the Basque Country (Basses-Pyrénées), Rouergue and Charente. Others were from Paris and the Savoy region.

As of 2017, only 6,400 French citizens are residing in Colombia. Most of them are highly concentrated in Bogotá.

=== German ===
The first German immigrants arrived in the 16th century, contracted by the Spanish Crown, and included explorers such as Ambrosio Alfinger and Nikolaus Federmann. There was another small wave of German immigrants at the end of the 19th and beginning of the 20th century, including Leo Siegfried Kopp, the founder of the famous Bavaria Brewery. SCADTA, a Colombian-German air transport corporation established by German expatriates in 1919, was the first commercial airline in the Western Hemisphere.

During the era of Nazi Germany, there were some German Nazi agitators in Colombia, such as Barranquilla businessman Emil Prufurt, but the majority were apolitical. Colombia asked Germans who were on the US blacklist to leave while allowing German and Jewish refugees in the country illegally to stay.

In December 1941, the United States government estimated that at least 4,000 Germans were living in Colombia.

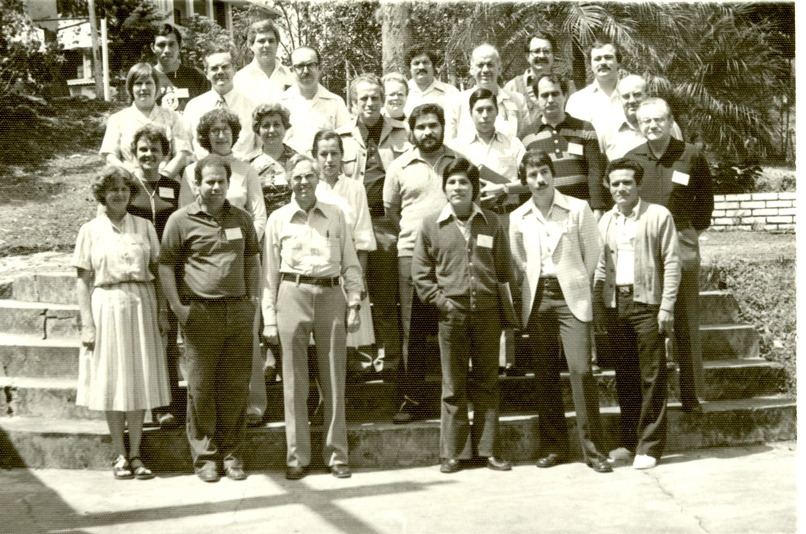
A meeting of Mennonites in Chachipay, Colombia (1980)

==== Mennonite ====
Moderately conservative Mennonites of German origin started to settle in Colombia in February 2016, with immigrants coming mainly from the region around Cuauhtémoc, Chihuahua, in northern Mexico, immigrants to Liveney colony mainly from Manitoba Colony and immigrants to Australia colony mainly from Ojo de la Yegua Colony (Nordkolonie), some 50 km north of Cuauhtémoc, Mexico, but others came from the United States, Canada and Bolivia. Liviney and Australia were established fincas and the Mennonites did not change their names.

In 2018 there were three Mennonite colonies some 90 km from Puerto Gaitán, Meta Department, Liviney (also known as Los Venados) with about 7,200 hectares, Australia with about 7,000 hectares and La Florida (also known as San Jorge) with about 2,000. In 2019, there was a new Mennonite colony named Buenos Aires (also known as Pajuil). These four Mennonite colonies comprise some 28,000 ha.

These Mennonites are mostly so-called "Russian" Mennonites who formed as an ethnic group in the 19th century in what is today Ukraine. They forbid television and radio, but allow cars and many other modern technologies they need for work. They speak Plautdietsch and women dress plain. A 2020 survey found that there are more than 200 Mennonite colonies in nine Latin American countries, with four in Colombia.

=== Italian ===
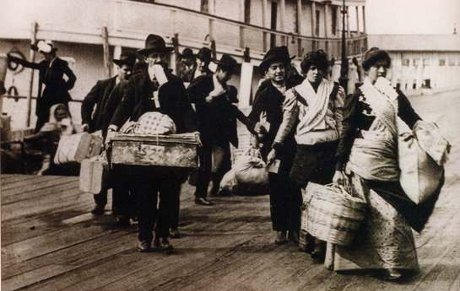
Italian immigrants arriving in Colombia

In the mid-19th century, many Italians arrived from the south of the country, especially from the province of Salerno and the regions of Basilicata and Calabria. They immigrated to the northern coast of Colombia; Barranquilla was the center of this first mass migration.

After World War 2, Italian emigration predominantly headed towards the capital (Bogotá), Cali, and Medellín, mostly coming from the northern regions of Italy. It is estimated that 2,000,000 Colombians have Italian ancestry.

=== Spanish ===
Spanish Colombians are Colombians of full or partial Spanish descent. Due to Colombia's history as a Spanish colony, many Colombians are of full or partial Spanish descent. Colombian culture is heavily influenced by Spain's. Because of this, combined with the Colombian government using "White Colombian" instead of "Spanish Colombian", the term is rarely used.

==== Basque ====
Basque priests introduced Handball into Colombia. Along with business, Basque immigrants in Colombia were devoted to teaching and public administration. In the first years of the Andean multinational company, Basque sailors navigated as captains and pilots on most of the ships until the country could train its own crews. In Bogotá, there is a small colony of 30 to 40 families who emigrated due to the Spanish Civil War.

== Jewish ==
Colombia was one of the early focal points of Sephardi immigration. Jewish converts to Christianity and some crypto-Jews also sailed with the early explorers. It has been suggested that the present-day culture of business entrepreneurship in Antioquia and Valle del Cauca is attributable to Sephardi immigration.

A wave of Ashkenazi immigrants came after the rise of Nazism in 1933, followed by as many as 17,000 German Jews. From 1939 until the end of World War II, immigration was forced to stop through anti-immigrant policies and restrictions on immigration from Germany.

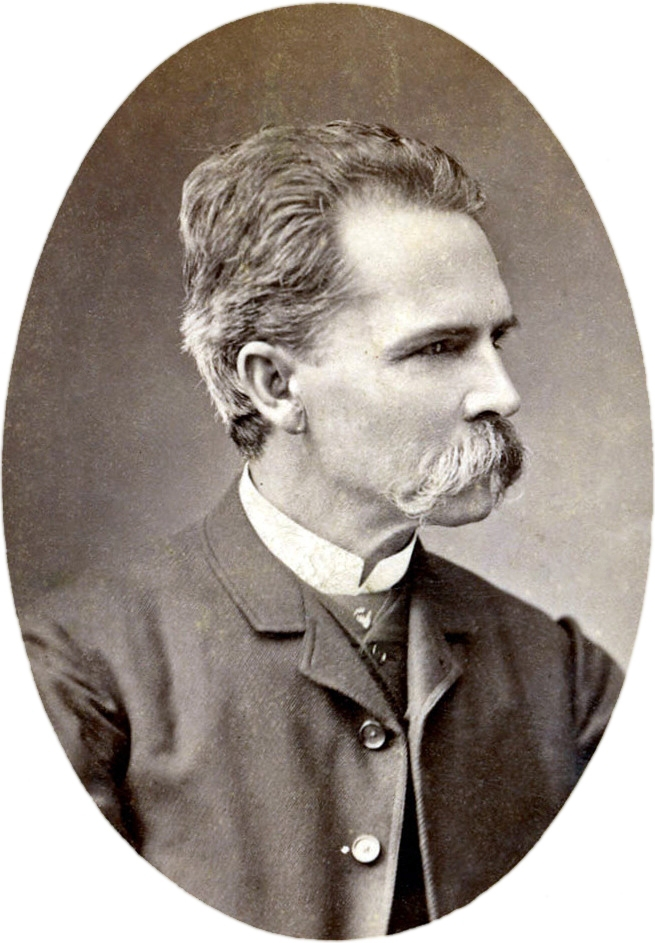
Portrait of Jorge Isaacs, Colombian Jewish writer and intellectual

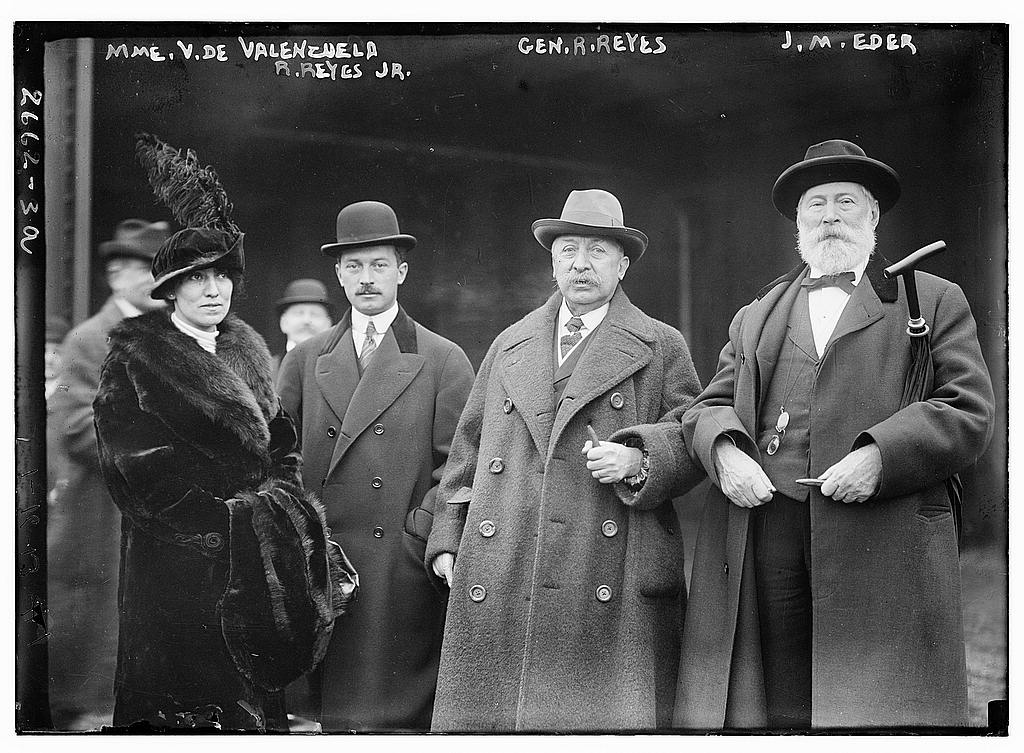
Colombian Jewish entrepreneur James Martin Eder

== Middle Eastern ==
The largest wave of Middle Eastern immigration began around 1880 and remained during the first two decades of the 20th century. They were mainly Maronite Christians from Lebanon, Syria and Ottoman Palestine, fleeing financial hardships and the repression of the Turkish Ottoman Empire. When they were first processed in the ports of Colombia, they were classified as Turks (in part because most of them had Ottoman Passports at the time).

During the early 20th century, numerous Jewish immigrants came from Turkey, North Africa, and Syria. Shortly after, Jewish immigrants began to arrive from Eastern Europe. Armenians, Lebanese, Syrians, Palestinians, and some Israelis have continued to settle in Colombia.

Between 700,000 and 3,200,000 Colombians have full or partial Middle Eastern descent. Due to a lack of information, it is impossible to know the exact number of people who immigrated to Colombia. A figure of 50,000-100,000 from 1880 to 1930 may be reliable. Regardless of the figure, the Lebanese are perhaps the biggest immigrant group, next to the Spanish, since independence. Cartagena, Cali, and Bogotá were among the cities with Colombia's largest number of Arabic-speaking representatives in 1945.

=== Lebanese ===
Colombia has the third-largest Lebanese population abroad below only Argentina and Brazil, with an estimated population of between 1,200,000 and 2,500,000 people. Between 1880 and 1930, it is estimated 10,000 to 30,000 Lebanese migrants relocated to Colombia.

=== Palestinian ===
According to a 2025 article by Raúl Zibechi for The North American Congress on Latin America, there were 100,000 Palestinians in Colombia. Approximate estimations by the Embassy of Palestine in Bogotá were between 100,000 and 120,000 people in 2019, this included first, second, third, and fourth generation Palestinian immigrants.

=== Syrian ===
Most Syrian Colombians came to Colombia in the late 19th and early 20th century, with notable populations in Córdoba, Cartagena, and other cities.

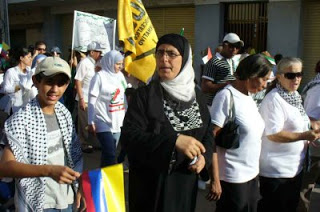
Lebanese Colombians in Maicao (2014)

== See also ==
- Colombians
- White people
- Immigration to Colombia
- Race and Ethnicity in Colombia
- Demographics of Colombia
- Mestizo Colombians
- Afro-Colombians
- Indigenous peoples in Colombia
- Romani people in Colombia

=== White communities in Colombia ===
- Spanish Colombians (Basques)
- Arab Colombians (Lebanese, Syrian)
- Italian Colombians
- German Colombians (Mennonite)
- French Colombians
- Polish Colombians
- History of the Jews in Colombia
