= Spanish Colombians =

Colombians of Spanish descent

Spanish Colombian hispanocolombiano
Total population
- Most Colombians are of full or partial Spanish origin.

Regions with significant populations
- Throughout the country but mostly in the Andean Region, Caribbean Region, Orinoquia Region and major cities.

Languages
- Colombian Spanish

Religion
- Catholicism

Related ethnic groups
- Spanish people, Basque Colombians, Mestizo Colombians, Colombian Jews

Spanish Colombians are Colombians of full or partial Spanish descent. Due to Colombia's history as a Spanish colony, many Colombians are of full or partial Spanish descent. Colombian culture is heavily influenced by Spain's. Because of this, combined with the Colombian government using "White Colombian" instead of "Spanish Colombian", the term is rarely used.

== History ==
Spanish explorers arrived in Colombia in 1499 to colonize the land. They built settlements in territories of the Musica Confederation, ignoring the views of the people who lived there. These establishments continued for three centuries with occupation, genocide, and war. While introducing a large African slave population, they displaced the Indigenous peoples. In 1499, the first Spanish explorer, Alonso de Ojeda, arrived on the coast of northern Colombia (Cabo de la Vela).

n 1501 Rodrigo de Bastidas crossed the coast between Cartagena and La Guajira, discovering the Magdalena River. In 1510 Alonso de Ojeda founded San Sebastián de Urabá, the first Spanish settlement there, but that same year its provisional ruler, Francisco Pizarro, left. The settlement was moved to a site in the Gulf of Urabá and launched under the direction of Martín Fernández de Enciso as Santa María la Antigua del Darién. This city, the capital of the first Spanish government in the Castilla del Oro, was in abandoned in 1517. With Santa Marta (1525) and Cartagena (1533), the Spanish established control of the Colombian coast. Conquistador Gonzalo Jimenez de Quesada entered the central region of Cundinamarca and Boyacá, conquering the powerful Chibcha culture, founding the city of Santa Fe de Bogota, Tunja ordered Gonzalo Suarez Rendon to name it the New Kingdom of Granada region.

To establish a civil government in New Granada, he created a Real Audiencia in Santa Fe de Bogota in 1548-1549. The Royal Court combined executive and judicial authority until a presidency/governorship in 1564 assumed executive powers. Until 1550 the territory of Colombia was formed by the governors of Santa Marta and Cartagena, which were subject to the Audiencia of Santo Domingo, and Popayan who was subject to the viceroyalty of Peru. The jurisdiction of the Real Audiencia de Santa Fe de Bogotá included these governorates since 1550 and extended in time over the surrounding provinces that were forming around the country corresponding to the New Granada.

In 1717, Santa Fe de Bogotá became capital of the Viceroyalty of New Granada, although that was suspended in 1724 due to financial problems. It was reinstated in 1740 and continued until the loss of Spanish power over the territories in the 1810s, which led Colombia become one of South America's first independent nation and the third-oldest independent republic after Haiti and the United States.

== See also ==
- Colombia–Spain relations
- White Colombians
- Colombians
- Colombians in Spain
