= Immigration to Colombia =

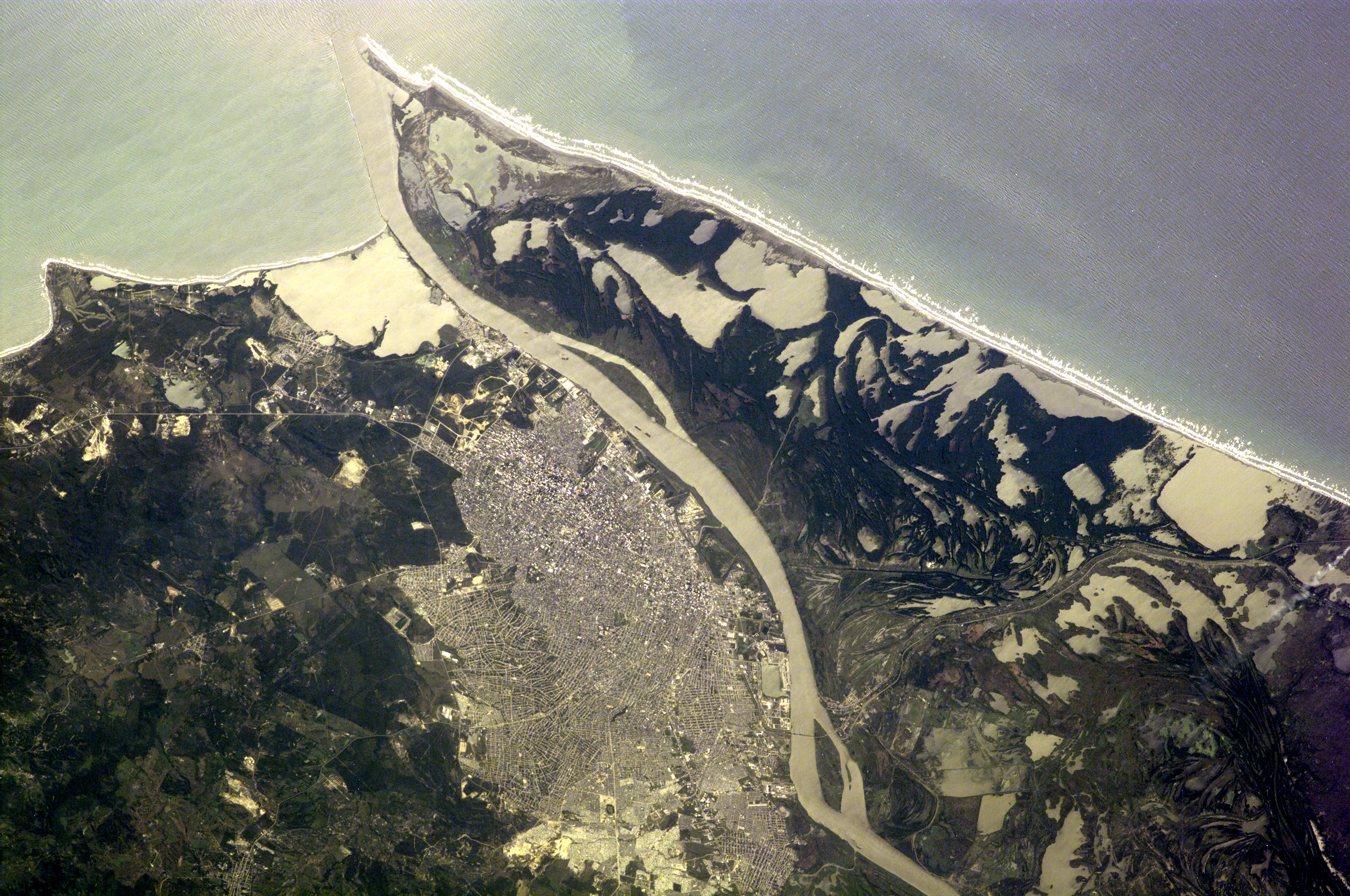
The largest concentration of foreign immigrants in Colombia is in Barranquilla, which was the main entrance port into Colombia, it also received the name "Puerta de Oro de Colombia" (Colombia's golden gate)

Immigration to Colombia during the early 19th and late 20th Century, is what makes it one of the most diverse countries in the world, above other countries in the Latin region. Colombia inherited from the Spanish Empire harsh rules against immigration, first in the Viceroyalty of New Granada and later in the Colombian Republic. The Constituent Assembly of Colombia and the subsequent reforms to the national constitution were much more open to the immigrants and the economic aperture. However citizenship through naturalization of foreigners, with the exception of those children of Colombians born abroad, is still difficult to acquire because 'Jus soli' law is not allowed by the government, and only 'Jus sanguinis' law is accepted. Immigration in Colombia is managed by the "Migración Colombia" agency.

Colombia is experiencing large waves of immigration from other Latin American countries, Europe, East Asia, and North America over the past five years. due to improvements in quality of life, security, and economic opportunities.

== History ==
=== Colonial period ===
European immigration in Colombia began in 1510 with the colonization of San Sebastián de Urabá. In 1526, settlers founded Santa Marta, the oldest Spanish city still in existence in Colombia. Many Spaniards began their explorations searching for gold, while others Spaniards established themselves as leaders of the native social organizations, teaching natives the Christian faith and the ways of their civilization. Catholic priests would provide education for Native Americans that otherwise was unavailable. Within 100 years after the first Spanish settlement, nearly 95 percent of all Native Americans in Colombia had died. The majority of the deaths of Native Americans were the cause of diseases such as measles and smallpox, which were spread by European settlers.

European (Spanish and French colonist) settlement focused mainly in the Andean highlands and Lebanese for the Caribbean coast, but little European settlement took place in the Chocó department of the Pacific coast and the Amazonian plains. Out of all Spanish nationalities, the Castilians and the Basques were the most represented. Over time, Europeans intermarried often with the Amerindian peoples (i.e. the Chibchas), and to produce a mixed-race population which are the majority of people in Colombia today.

=== European immigration ===
Colombia was one of the early focus of Basque immigration. Between 1540 and 1559, 8.9 percent of the residents of Colombia were of Basque origin. It has been suggested that the present-day incidence of business entrepreneurship in the Antioquia Department is attributable to the Basque immigration and Basque character traits. Few Colombians of distant Basque descent are aware of their Basque ethnic heritage. In Bogotá, there is a small colony of thirty to forty families who emigrated as a consequence of the Spanish Civil War or because of different opportunities. Basque priests were the ones that introduced handball into Colombia. Basque immigrants in Colombia were devoted to teaching and public administration. In the first years of the Andean multinational company, Basque sailors navigated as captains and pilots on the majority of the ships until the country was able to train its own crews.

Italian presence is documented from the 16th century; research published by the Banco de la República on the early settlement of Cartagena de Indias identifies settlers originating from Genoa and the island of Lipari, Sicily, among the foreigners present during the first decades following the city's foundation. German involvement in the region also dates to the 16th century. German conquistadors associated with the Welser family, including Nikolaus Federmann and Ambrosius Alfinger, participated in expeditions between 1529 and 1539 into areas that today form part of Colombia; Federmann's expedition crossed the eastern plains and reached the New Kingdom of Granada.

European immigration increased considerably during the era of mass migration of the late 19th and early 20th centuries. Samuel L. Baily and Eduardo José Míguez's study of migration to Latin America estimates that approximately 126,000 European immigrants arrived in Colombia during the broader period of European mass migration, placing the country among the destinations for European migrants in Latin America.

In December 1941 the United States government estimated that there were 10,000 Germans living in the Caribbean region of Colombia. There were some Nazi agitators in Colombia, such as Barranquilla businessman Emil Prufurt. However, most German inhabitants arrived in the late 19th century as farmers and professionals. One such entrepreneur was Leo Siegfried Kopp, the founder of the brewery Bavaria. SCADTA, a Colombian-German air transport corporation which was established by German expatriates in 1919, was the first commercial airline in the western hemisphere.

=== Arab immigration ===
Many Colombians have origins in the Western Asian countries of Lebanon, Jordan, Syria and Palestine, It is estimated that Arab Colombians represent 3.2 million people. Many moved to Colombia to escape the repression of the Turkish Ottoman Empire and/or financial hardships. When they were first processed in Colombia's ports, they were classified as "Turks" or "Turcos" in Spanish. It is estimated that Colombia has a Lebanese population of 700,000 direct descendants and 1,500,000 who have partial ancestry. Meanwhile, the Palestine population is estimated between 100,000 and 120,000. Most Syrian-Lebanese immigrants established themselves in the Caribbean Region of Colombia in the towns of Santa Marta, Santa Cruz de Lorica, Fundación, Aracataca, Ayapel, Calamar, Ciénaga, Cereté, Montería, Cartagena and Barranquilla near the basin of the Magdalena River, in La Guajira Department, notably in Maicao and in the Archipelago of San Andrés, Providencia and Santa Catalina in but also large populations in the interior of the country such as Bogotá and Cali. Many Arab-Colombians adapted their names and surnames to the Spanish language to assimilate more quickly in their communities. Some Colombian surnames of Arab origin include: Guerra (originally Harb), Cure (Originally Khoury) Domínguez (Ñeca), Matuk(Originally Maatouk), Durán (Dahir), Lara (Labdah), Cristo (Saliba), among other surnames.

Consequently, there were other immigrants from the Western Asia, including a number of Armenian, Turkish, Georgian and Cypriot immigrants who arrived in the country during the early 20th century.

=== East Asian immigration ===
The Eastern Asian communities in Colombia were not very numerous compared to Brazil or Peru, but still some groups of thousands of migrants arrived from the 20th century with the Japanese and Koreans until the 21st century with the Chinese. It is estimated that the first groups of Asian immigrants arrived in Buenaventura and Barranquilla between 1910-1940 Many Chinese have immigrated to Colombia in recent decades.

== Immigration by origin ==
=== Africa ===
Enslaved Africans began being trafficked to Colombia by the beginning of the 16th century. Cartagena de Indias was the main port of entry of slaves into the country during the colonial period and during its highest boom it turned out to be the most lucrative business in the city, trafficking over 1 million enslaved beings through its port. Slavery wouldn't be abolished in Colombia until 1851; although by this point enslaved beings only accounted for 0.76% of the population, since most Afro Colombians were free people of colour.

According to the 2018 national census, 9.34% of Colombians are of full or parcial Black African ancestry, with the largest concentration in the department of Chocó, where they represent 82.1% of the population. However, external sources estimates Afro-Colombians are between 15% and 26% of total population. Genetic research shows Subsaharan African admixture in general Colombian population ranges between 0.5% and 20%.

=== Western Asia and North Africa ===
Many Arab immigrants have arrived in Colombia from Egypt, Lebanon, Syria, Iraq, Jordan and Palestine. The Arabs settled mostly in the northern coast, in cities such as Barranquilla, Cartagena, Santa Marta, and Maicao. Gradually they began to settle inland too (except for Antioquia). Many Colombians of Arab descent derive their origins from Catholics/Maronites from Lebanon or Syria.

Due to the Arab Spring, many Arabs arrived in Colombia seeking political asylum, particularly from Syria.

=== Chinese ===
The city of Cali has the largest Asian community because of its proximity to the Pacific Coast; they also live around the nation in other cities such as Barranquilla, Bucaramanga, Bogotá and Medellín. The DANE says the Chinese population is growing 10% every year. In recent years, particularly Chinese restaurants have experienced a surge and have become popular businesses in nearly every Colombian city.

There is a large gap in knowledge of the Chinese diaspora in Colombia in the period from the beginning of the 20th century until 1970–1980. The century began with the political upheavals in China that led to the creation of two political factions among the Chinese in and outside China, and eventually caused the communist revolution and the founding of the two separate Chinese states, one on the mainland and one in Taiwan. The effect for the Chinese diaspora was the creation not only of political but also more differentiation between migrants and distinguished by locality of origin, language, and history of migration. Thus, until today, in terms of organization, they are, on the one hand, the "Overseas Chinese Association", founded by Chinese who migrated to Colombia in the 1980s, and on the other, the Chinese Cultural Centre in Bogotá, founded in 1988 by a Taiwanese government institution (Zhang 1991).

Moreover, it is known that in 1970 there were over 6,000 Chinese living in Colombia, which means that they kept coming to this country. It can be assumed that the anti-immigrant atmosphere in many countries was the major cause of continued Chinese immigration to Colombia. The migration did not come from China, because during the first three decades of the People's Republic of China, emigration was severely restricted. In fact, it is known that in the early 20th century, due to xenophobia in the United States, a large number of Chinese migrated to Colombia. Restrepo (2001) states that at that time various groups of immigrants settled in Barranquilla.

The end of Chinese anti-immigration laws in the United States during the 1980s allowed many Chinese to emigrate from Colombia to the United States. As a result, of the 5,600 people of Chinese origin reported in 1982 (Poston and Yu 1990) in the 1990s were only 3,400, most of whom live in Bogota, Barranquilla, Cali, Cartagena, Medellin, Santa Marta, Manizales, Cucuta, and Pereira. All these movements flow of people around the world support the notion that the "Chinese diaspora" is far from staying in a country, take an identity, or "assimilate". Political, economic, social, and personal issues contributed to the circulation of the Chinese movement between various locations. These factors also have an important influence in the forms of residence and, more recently, in human trafficking.

=== North American ===
About 3,000 North Americans arrived in Barranquilla during the late 19th century. By 1958, American immigrants comprised 10% of all immigrants living in Colombia. There are now 60,000 United States citizens living in Colombia, many of whom are Colombian emigrants to the United States who chose to return to Colombia. The barrios El Prado, Paraiso, and some others were created by Americans, also schools and universities were built by American architects such as the Universidad del Norte, the American School and many more.

When enumerated by citizenship, many Americans are from families that emigrated to the United States and then repatriated.

=== Jewish ===
Early Jewish settlers were converted Jews, known as Marranos, from Spain. In the years prior to World War II, there was a second wave of Jewish immigrants fleeing persecution from the Nazis. Most Colombian Jews live in Bogotá, Medellín, Cali and Barranquilla where are Jewish schools such as: Colegio Colombo Hebreo, Theodo Hertlz, Colegio Hebreo Unión.

As of the 21st century, approximately 8,000 practicing Jews live in Colombia. Most of them are concentrated in Bogotá, with about 3,500 members, and Cali, with about 1,000 members. Others communities are also found in Barranquilla and Medellín. Very few Jews practice religious observance; among those who do, the majority are Orthodox. German Jewish communities in Bogota and Cali also preserve much of their traditions.

=== Romani people ===
The Romani people came during colonial times, often forced by the Spanish to move to South America. Romani people also came during World War I and World War II. Most of them settled in the metropolitan area of Barranquilla.

=== Spanish ===
Spanish immigration in what is now Colombia was massive and continuous throughout the colonial period. Spanish descendants, a majority of which mixed to varying degrees with indigenous peoples over the centuries, form the bulk of the Colombian population. After a brief period in which it stopped abruptly following independence, immigration slowly resumed albeit at a much lower level. In the 20th century there was another wave of Spanish immigrants fleeing persecution from the Franquistas during and after the Spanish Civil War. Migration also spiked as a result of economic hardships in Spain during the 50s. Due to high unemployment in Spain, several hundreds of Spaniards have immigrated to Colombia for better working prospects in recent years (2008 onwards). Furthermore, several thousands of Colombians who emigrated to Spain from 1990 to 2010 (about 280,000 people) now return to Colombia, and sometimes have dual citizenship.

=== Italians ===
Italian immigration in Colombia has had place in the XIX and XX centuries. The Italian immigrant population in Colombia, is mostly located in cities such as Cartagena, Barranquilla, Santa Marta, Montería, Cali, Medellin and Bogotá. The Italians have left some imprint in Colombian Spanish and gastronomy. The Italian government estimated in 2018 that around 2 million Colombians have Italian ancestry.

=== Germans ===
Although they have been in Colombia since Colonial times, German immigration to Colombia became particularly significant during the 19th and early 20th centuries. German merchants, entrepreneurs and professionals established themselves in commercial centers such as Santander, Bogotá and Barranquilla, where German-owned enterprises became influential in commerce, banking, river transportation and, later, aviation. One of the best-known 19th-century German immigrants was Leo Siegfried Kopp, who developed commercial enterprises in Santander before establishing the Bavaria brewery in Bogotá in 1889 and became an important figure in Colombia's early industrialization. German immigration continued during the interwar period, particularly to the Colombian Caribbean. Historical research on Barranquilla describes the city's German community as one of its most economically influential foreign communities during the first half of the 20th century. In the Colombian census of 1928 Germans consequently represented about 22.4% of European nationalities recorded individually in the census.

During World War II, the sizeable German presence in Colombia attracted increasing attention from the United States because of Colombia's proximity to the Panama Canal. United States diplomatic records reported suspected German radio communications from SCADTA's Barranquilla station to Berlin, while the Federal Bureau of Investigation's wartime Special Intelligence Service stationed an agent at the United States consulate in Barranquilla as part of its monitoring of Axis activities in Colombia. Colombian historical research likewise documents an openly National Socialist Stützpunkt ("support point") operating in Barranquilla and notes that the city was viewed by Allied authorities as a possible center of Nazi activity. This did not mean that the German community as a whole supported National Socialism; wartime suspicions were disputed by Colombian authorities, while individuals and businesses accused of Axis sympathies were placed on United States blacklists and some German nationals were later interned as a wartime security measure.

In 2025, the Stiftung Verbundenheit mit den Deutschen im Ausland, a German organization that serves as an intermediary organization for the Federal Ministry of the Interior and whose Latin American programs receive support from the Federal Foreign Office, estimated that approximately 1.5 million people of German ancestry lived in Colombia, equivalent to about 3% of the country's population.

=== Russians ===
In the 19th and 20th centuries many Russians went to Antioquia and Risaralda, escaping from communism and the Soviet government. The former USSR (1917-1991) included other nations like Lithuania and Ukraine.

=== Irish ===
During the independence of Colombia, More than 8.000 Irish soldiers fought to give independence to the country, many were recruited from Dublin, London and other cities to fight with Simón Bolívar's troops to liberate Colombia from Spain. Subsequently, post-independence Irish immigrants continued to arrive, especially to the departments of Antioquia, Caldas and Risaralda. In the first half of 20th century, Irish people arrived in Colombia for a new life and as missionaries to expand the Catholic faith in the country. In the last years of the 20th century and first years of 21st century, some Irish people came to Colombia. Some came to work in the many multinational companies but a few of them were involved with terrorist groups like the FARC.

=== French ===
There is an important French community in Colombia, mainly concentrated in the coastal cities of Barranquilla, Cartagena, and Santa Marta, as well as in Bogotá. French immigration began in a regular pattern during the 18th and 19th century and highly influenced the country's economic and political systems (the Betancourt family is of French descent) and entertainment industry. Another example is Atanasio Girardot who was a Colombian revolutionary leader. Some WWII refugees from France came to Colombia, but often for a temporary time. Nowadays, Colombia has also become a cheap tourist or retirement destination for French citizens. Contrary to common perceptions, the frequent Colombian surname Betancourt does not signal French descent but rather descent from the Canary Islands (Spain), where it is common since the islands were conquered and submitted by Frenchman Juan de Betancourt for the Spanish crown in the 16th century. French surnames such as Lafaurie, Chaux, Lamouroux, Betancourt and many more are frequently deeply rooted in Colombian society.

=== Venezuelans ===
The Venezuelan population in Colombia is estimated at 2,250,000, due to political instability, corruption and crime in Venezuela. Large populations of Venezuelans are found in Bogotá, Cali, Medellín, Bucaramanga, Barranquilla, Cartagena and Cúcuta. Previously Colombians had emigrated to Venezuela due to political unrest. However, during the last decade the trend has reversed and Venezuelans increasingly immigrate to Colombia. A Venezuelan refugee crisis began in 2014; as of 2021, about 1.7 million Venezuelans displaced by the crisis are currently in Colombia, most of whom are either undocumented or are on temporary visas.

=== Ecuadorians ===
The history of Colombia and Ecuador is strongly related. Many people of South Colombia (specially, the Nariño, Putumayo and Cauca Departments) share traditions with the Ecuadorian people. This has led to migration between both countries. Many Ecuadorians have come to the major cities of Colombia (Bogotá, Medellin, Cali, Bucaramanga) as merchants.

=== Number of people with permanent Colombian residence by nationality ===
Note: only people that have lived in Colombia for at least 5 years can acquire permanent residence.

Place	Country	2013
1	Venezuela	5.338
2	United States	3.693
3	Spain	2.370
4	Mexico	1.711
5	China	1.428
6	Argentina	1.117
7	Peru	1.056
8	Germany	1.006
9	Brazil	915
10	Ecuador	885
11	France	884
12	India	858
13	Portugal	800
14	Italy	747
15	Cuba	695
16	Nicaragua	651
17	Rest of the world	6.338
Source: OAS (2013)

=== Number of people living in Colombia by Nationality 2017 - 2020 ===
Place	Country	Population		2020
Place	Country	2017	2019	2020
1	Venezuela	48,714	1,048,714	1,780,486
2	United States	20,140	20,140	20,810
3	Ecuador	15,212	15,212	19,180
4	Spain	7,086	7,086	17,122
5	Peru	5,391	5,391	5,680
6	Argentina	3,419	3,419	5,719
7	Mexico	3,050	3,050	5,641
8	Italy	3,001	3,001	3,225
9	Germany	2,523	2,523	2,156
10	Brazil	2,496	2,496	4,685
11	Panama	2,208	2,208	3,123
12	France	2,203	2,203	3,180
13	China	2,176	2,176	1,584
14	Chile	2,162	2,162	4,732
15	Cuba	1,945	1,945	2,534
16	United Kingdom	1,322	1,322	1,686
17	Lebanon	1,253	1,253	
18	Costa Rica	1,128	1,128	1,828
19	Canada	1,051	1,051	1,715
20	Bolivia	874	874	1,129
21	Japan	771	771	689
22	Switzerland	725	725	782
23	Russia	719	719	646
24	Nicaragua	611	611	
25	Israel	500	500	
26	Guatemala	490	490	857
27	Belgium	464	464	
28	Uruguay	464	464	662
29	Dominican Republic	410	410	1,046
30	El Salvador	409	409	782
31	Honduras	376	376	690
32	Netherlands	376	376	635
33	South Korea	292	292	
34	Poland	272	272	
35	Ukraine	241	241	
36	Romania	236	236	
37	Australia	234	234	
38	Paraguay	231	231	
39	Austria	222	222	
40	Vanuatu	221	221	
41	North Korea	213	213	
42	Sweden	194	194	
43	Jordan	190	190	
44	India	153	153	
45	Hungary	149	149	
46	Egypt	149	149	
47	Syria	145	145	
48	Ireland	139	139	
49	Iran	125	125	
50	Greece	124	124	
51	Haiti	122	122	
52	Afghanistan	122	122	
53	Portugal	121	121	
54	Philippines	102	102	
	Equatorial Guinea	100	100	
	Maldives	90	90	

Country	2017
Jamaica	63
Trinidad and Tobago	39
Puerto Rico	50
Saint Lucia	38
Barbados	30
Antigua and Barbuda	20
Saint Kitts and Nevis	10
Belize	20
Curaçao	40
Aruba	20
Total	7.348
Source: MacroDatos (2017)

South America

Country	2017
Guyana	20
Suriname	35
Total	79.098
Source: MacroDatos (2017)

Europe

Country	2017
Luxembourg	23
Czech Republic	41
Slovenia	30
Croatia	60
Albania	52
Bulgaria	90
Lithuania	48
Latvia	20
Estonia	22
Finland	50
Norway	87
Andorra	49
Malta	30
Iceland	30
Slovakia	80
Serbia	85
Georgia	30
Cyprus	30
Bosnia and Herzegovina	40
North Macedonia	20
San Marino	30
Total	21.104
Source: MacroDatos (2017)

Asia

Country	2017
Turkey	50
Armenia	40
Iraq	23
Saudi Arabia	74
United Arab Emirates	42
Pakistan	43
Indonesia	88
Bangladesh	50
Sri Lanka	30
Timor-Leste	30
Yemen	30
Mongolia	70
Thailand	74
Hong Kong	70
Vietnam	74
Total	6.660
Source: MacroDatos (2017)

Africa

Country	2017
Algeria	26
Morocco	74
Nigeria	49
Angola	56
South Africa	56
Mali	40
Senegal	35
Cameroon	30
Democratic Republic of the Congo	20
Cape Verde	40
Sierra Leone	35
Guinea	30
Ghana	38
Gambia	30
Somalia	60
Ethiopia	40
Eritrea	30
Ivory Coast	40
Liberia	28
Republic of the Congo	50
Total	928
Source: MacroDatos (2017)

Oceania

Country	2017
Australia	234
Vanuatu	221
New Zealand	54
Total	509
Source: MacroDatos (2017)

Total 138,920

== See also ==
- Colombian diaspora
- Demographics of Colombia
- Emigration from Colombia
