= Lebanese Colombians =

Lebanese Colombians Lebanon Colombia
كولومبي لبناني (in Arabic) Libaneses en Colombia (in Spanish)

Total population
- Estimates: 125,000; 700,000; 3,500,000

Regions with significant populations
- Barranquilla · Cartagena · Bucaramanga · Bogotá · Cali · Maicao · Santa Marta · Montería · Sincelejo.

Languages
- Colombian Spanish · Arabic · French

Religion
- Roman Catholicism, Islam

Related ethnic groups
- Syrian Colombians, Arab Colombians, Asian Colombians

Lebanese Colombians are Lebanese immigrants in Colombia and their descendants. Most of the Lebanese community's forebears immigrated to Colombia from the Ottoman Empire in the late 19th and early 20th centuries for economic, political and religious reasons. The first Lebanese moved to Colombia in the late nineteenth century. There was another wave in from the early to the late twentieth century. It is estimated that over 125,000 Lebanese immigrated to Colombia from 1900 to 1980.

Many Lebanese settled in the Caribbean region of Colombia, particularly in the cities of Cartagena, Santa Marta, Lorica, San Andrés (island), Fundación, Aracataca, Ayapel, Calamar, Ciénaga, Cereté, Montería, Valledupar, Sincelejo and Barranquilla, near the basin of the Magdalena River. The Lebanese subsequently expanded to other cities and by 1945 there were Lebanese living in Ocaña, Cúcuta, Barrancabermeja, Ibagué, Girardot, Honda, Tunja, Villavicencio, Pereira, Soatá, Neiva, Cali, Buga, Chaparral and Chinácota. The six major hubs of Lebanese population were present in Barranquilla, Cartagena, Bucaramanga, Bogotá, and Cali. The number of immigrants entering the country vary from 10,000 to 30,000 in 1945. Some of these immigrants were Christians and others were Muslims.

The vast majority of Lebanese Colombians are Catholics. However, in the 1940s another wave of Lebanese immigrants came to Colombia, settling in the town of Maicao, Guajira in northern Colombia. These immigrants were mostly Muslims and were attracted by the thriving commerce of the town, which was benefiting from the neighboring Venezuelan oil bonanza and the usual contraband of goods that flowed through the Guajira Peninsula.

== See also ==
- Arab diaspora
- Arab Colombians
- Lebanese diaspora
- Race and ethnicity in Colombia
- White Colombians
