= Arauca, Arauca =

Arauca
- Municipality and city
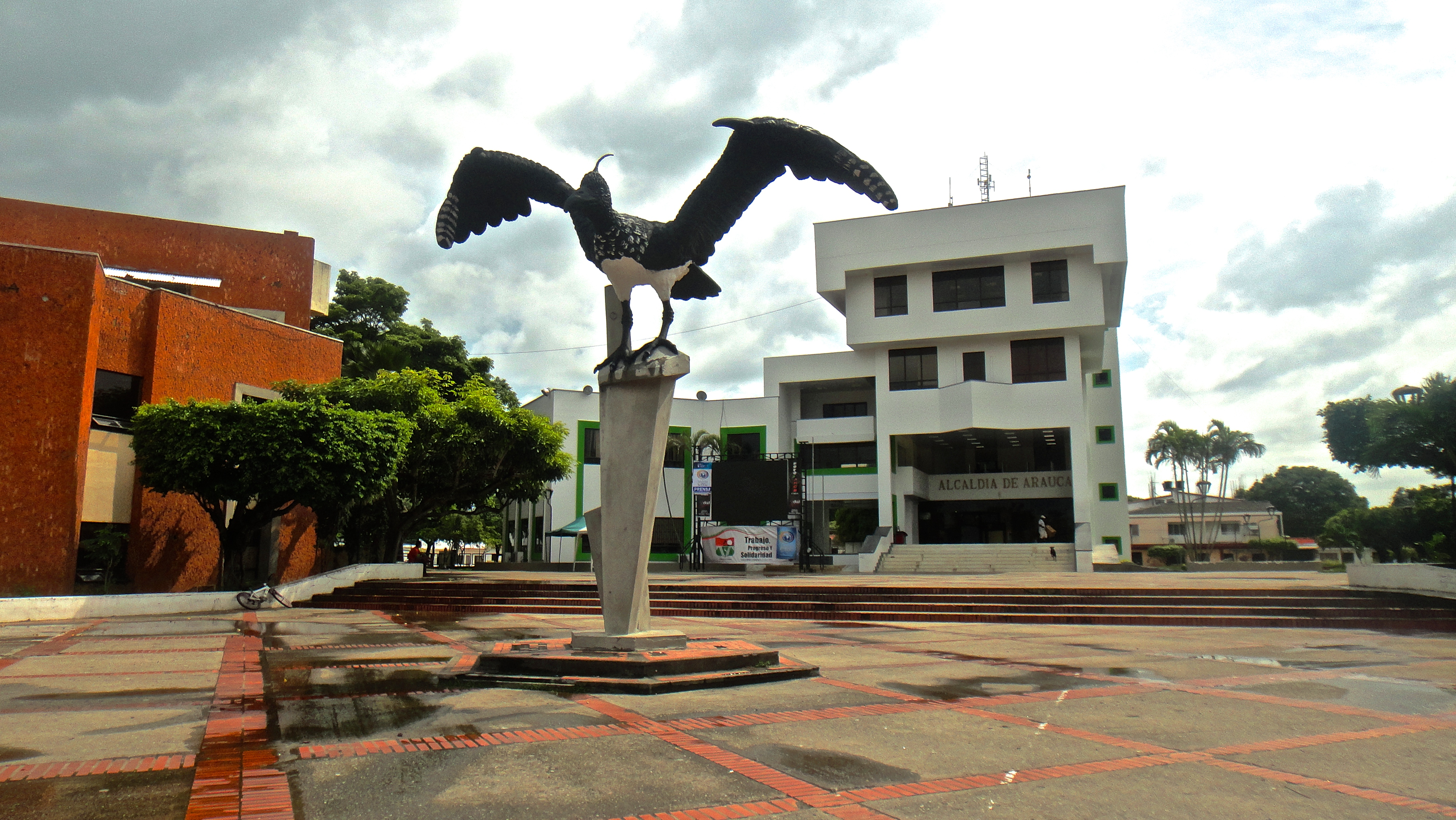
- Monument in front of the Arauca City Hall

- Flag Coat of arms

- Location of the municipality and town of Arauca in the Arauca Department

- Location in Colombia
- Coordinates: 7°5′26″N 70°45′42″W
- Country: Colombia
- Department: Arauca Department
- Founded: December 4, 1780

Government
  - Mayor: Juan Alfredo Quenza Ramos

Area
  - Municipality and city: 5,788 km^{2} (2,235 sq mi)
  - Urban: 21.39 km^{2} (8.26 sq mi)
- Elevation: 125 m (410 ft)

Population (2018 Census)
  - Municipality and city: 85,585
  - Density: 14.79/km^{2} (38.30/sq mi)
  - Urban: 74,195
  - Urban density: 3,469/km^{2} (8,984/sq mi)
- Demonym: Araucanian
- Time zone: UTC−5 (COL)
- Postcode: 810001-9
- Area code: 57 + 7
- Climate: Aw
- Website: Official website (in Spanish)

Arauca is a municipality and capital city of the Arauca Department of Colombia. Its full name is Villa de Santa Bárbara de Arauca, it is located at N 07° 05′ 25″ - W 70° 45′ 42″. The Municipality of Arauca has a total population of 85,585 (2018 census).

== History ==
The Arauca region was explored by the German conquistador Jorge de la Espira, or Georg von Speyer, in 1536. The early Spanish did not stay because they were on the quest for El Dorado. However, they were later followed by Jesuits and land-grantees who founded the first settlements.

Arauca was founded on December 4, 1780, by Juan Isidro Daboín on the site of an indigenous hamlet of about ten families called Guahibo. Arauca was named after the Arauca River, which now separates it from Venezuela, which river in turn was named for the indigenous people the Arauca. The area is flat and subject to frequent flooding from the river.

At one point, it was the capital of the New Granada Province of Casanare which was much larger than the current Department of Casanare. In addition, the Villa de Santa Bárbara de Arauca, has been:

- Capital of the Republic, under the revolutionary government, constituted July 16, 1816;
- Capital of the Police District (Comisaría especial) since 1911;
- Capital of the Province (Intendencia Nacional) of Arauca, 1955–1991;
- Oil capital of Colombia since 1986;
- Capital of the Department of Arauca since 1991.

== Climate ==
Climate data for Arauca (Santiago Pérez Quiroz Airport), elevation 128 m (420 ft), (1981–2010)
Month	Jan	Feb	Mar	Apr	May	Jun	Jul	Aug	Sep	Oct	Nov	Dec	Year
Mean daily maximum °C (°F)	33.1 (91.6)	34.3 (93.7)	34.6 (94.3)	33.2 (91.8)	31.2 (88.2)	30.0 (86.0)	29.9 (85.8)	30.6 (87.1)	31.5 (88.7)	31.7 (89.1)	31.5 (88.7)	31.9 (89.4)	32 (90)
Daily mean °C (°F)	27.4 (81.3)	28.3 (82.9)	28.8 (83.8)	27.7 (81.9)	26.6 (79.9)	25.8 (78.4)	25.7 (78.3)	26.1 (79.0)	26.6 (79.9)	26.8 (80.2)	26.9 (80.4)	26.9 (80.4)	26.9 (80.4)
Mean daily minimum °C (°F)	20.6 (69.1)	21.2 (70.2)	22.2 (72.0)	22.9 (73.2)	23.0 (73.4)	22.8 (73.0)	22.6 (72.7)	22.7 (72.9)	22.8 (73.0)	22.9 (73.2)	22.9 (73.2)	21.9 (71.4)	22.4 (72.3)
Average precipitation mm (inches)	11.9 (0.47)	23.8 (0.94)	50.6 (1.99)	147.2 (5.80)	267.5 (10.53)	304.7 (12.00)	309.6 (12.19)	224.7 (8.85)	187.1 (7.37)	200.1 (7.88)	109.7 (4.32)	30.8 (1.21)	1,867.7 (73.53)
Average precipitation days (≥ 1.0 mm)	2	3	5	13	19	22	22	20	17	14	10	5	148
Average relative humidity (%)	71	66	66	76	84	87	87	86	85	85	84	79	80
Mean monthly sunshine hours	272.8	228.7	201.5	162.0	151.9	138.0	145.7	164.3	177.0	201.5	210.0	248.0	2,301.4
Mean daily sunshine hours	8.8	8.1	6.5	5.4	4.9	4.6	4.7	5.3	5.9	6.5	7.0	8.0	6.3
Source: Instituto de Hidrologia Meteorologia y Estudios Ambientales

== Demographics ==
=== Ethnic groups ===
Human biological diversity and ethnicity
1. White and Mestizo (92.4%)
2. Afro-Colombian (includes Mixed) (5.90%)
3. American Indian (1.70%)

The White and Mestizo people dominate the city making up 92.4% of its population together. Blacks make up 5.9% of the city and Indigenous people make up 1.7% of the city.

== Economy ==
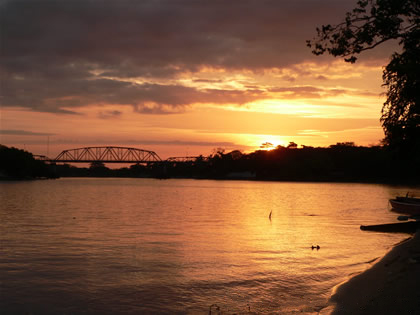
Sunset over the Río Arauca

Since its founding, Arauca's primary business has been the raising of cattle, and this is still true. But increasingly, since 1984 it is the exploitation of nearby petroleum (oil sands) that has provided the bulk of municipal income in recent years. The building of the bridge, Puente José Antonio Páez, connecting it with Venezuela stimulated the economy, as did completion of the highway to Bogotá, known as The Route of the Liberators (La Ruta de los Libertadores). Arauca is now on the main surface route between Caracas and Bogotá.

== Transportation ==
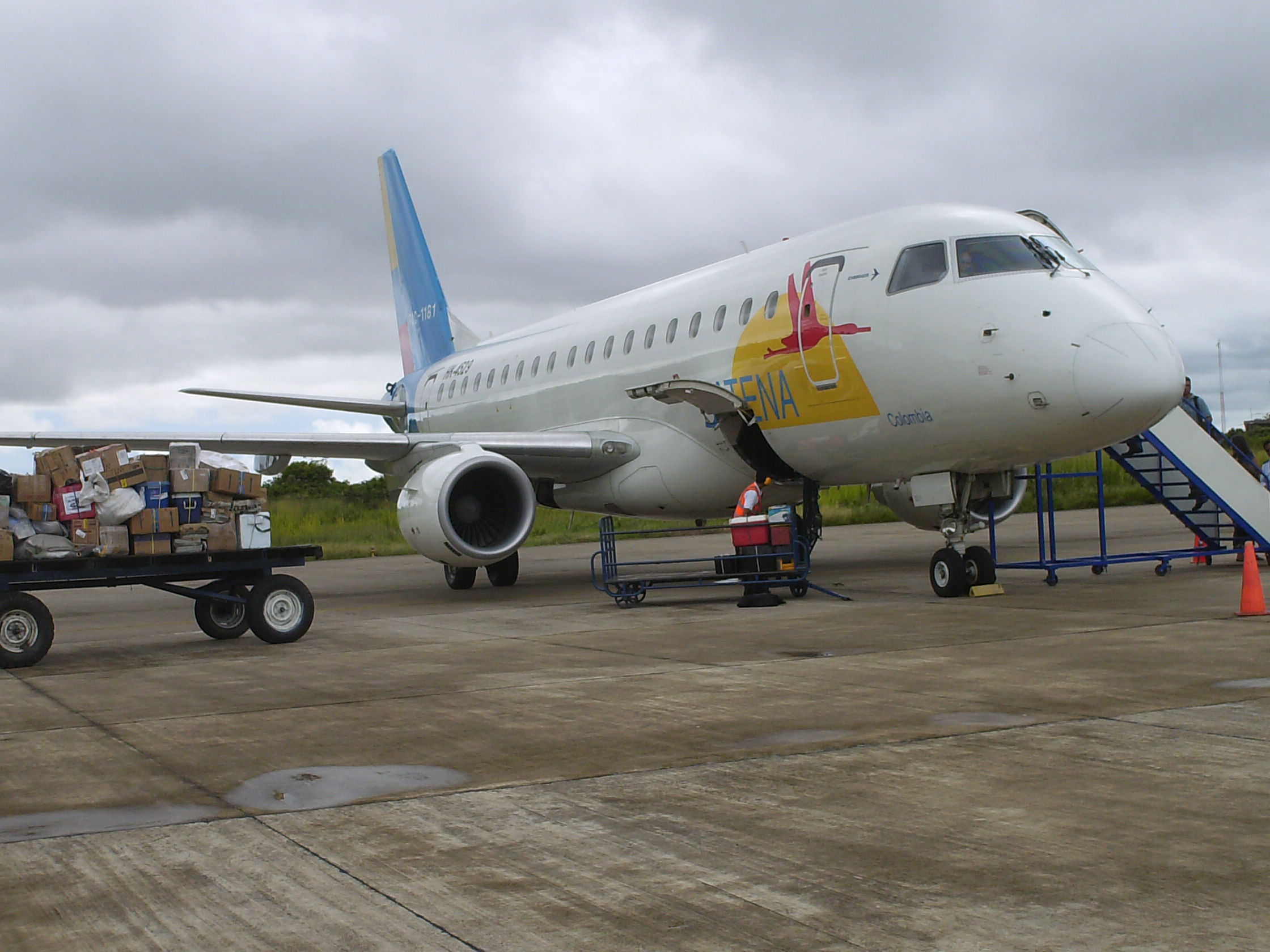
Embraer 170 jet of the Satena fleet, during loading in the Santiago Pérez Quiroz Airport

- Santiago Perez Airport
