= Arab Colombians =

Arab diaspora in Colombia

Regions with significant populations
- 3.2 million

Languages
- Colombian Spanish, Arabic

Religion
- Roman Catholicism; Eastern Catholicism (Maronites); Oriental Orthodox; Eastern Orthodoxy; Islam; Druze

Related ethnic groups
- Lebanese Colombian, Syrian Colombians, Arab Venezuelans, Arab Argentines, Arab Mexicans, Arab Brazilians, Arab diaspora, Arab Christians, Arab Muslims, Druze, Lebanese, Syrians, Palestinians, other Arabs

Arab Colombians (Arabic: كولومبيون عرب) are Arab immigrants and their descendants in the Republic of Colombia. The National Administrative Department of Statistics estimated the country's Middle Eastern descendant population to be 3.2 million people.

Most of the original Arab migrants to Colombia came from modern day Lebanon, Jordan, Syria and Palestine. The primary wave of migration occurred in the late 19th century; when Arab immigrants were first processed through the country's ports, they were classified as Turks because the lands they came from were then territories of the Ottoman Empire. Colombia's National Administrative Department of Statistics estimated the country's Middle Eastern descendant population at 3.2 million, including 700,000 of Lebanese descent.

Most of whom were described as "Syrian-Lebanese" migrants established themselves in the Caribbean Region of Colombia, in cities and towns near the basin of the Magdalena River such as Maicao, Riohacha, Santa Marta, Lorica, Fundación, Aracataca, Ayapel, Calamar, Ciénaga, Cereté, Montería, Valledupar, Sincelejo and Barranquilla. The population later expanded to other areas, and by 1945, there were Arab Middle Easterners moving inland to areas such as Ocaña, Cúcuta, Barrancabermeja, Ibagué, Girardot, Honda, Tunja, Villavicencio, Pereira, Soatá, Neiva, Buga, Chaparral and Chinácota.

The five major cities where the Levantine Middle Eastern population was present were Santa Marta, Barranquilla, Cartagena, Bogotá and Cali. Most arrived as members of the Eastern Orthodox and Eastern Catholic churches, but the majority became Roman Catholic. Estimates of the number of immigrants entering the country in 1945 vary from 40,000 to 50,000; most of these immigrants were Christian and a minority were Muslim.

Many Arabs adapted their names and surnames to the Spanish language as a way to adapt more quickly in the communities where they arrived. For example, people of Arab origin took surnames such as Guerra (originally Harb), Domínguez (Ñeca), Durán (Doura), Lara (Larach), and Cristo (Salibe).

== Population ==
It was estimated by Colombia's National Administrative Department of Statistics that the country has a Middle Eastern descending population of 3.2 million, this counted four immigrant generations.

== Communities ==
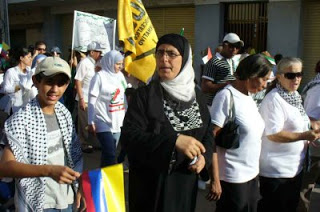
Lebanese Colombians in Maicao (2014)

=== Lebanese ===
Colombia has the third-largest Lebanese population abroad below only Argentina and Brazil, with an estimated population of between 1,200,000 and 2,500,000 people. Between 1880 and 1930, it is estimated 10,000 to 30,000 Lebanese migrants relocated to Colombia.

=== Palestinian ===
According to a 2025 article by Raúl Zibechi for The North American Congress on Latin America, there were 100,000 Palestinians in Colombia. Approximate estimations by the Embassy of Palestine in Bogotá were between 100,000 and 120,000 people in 2019, this included first, second, third, and fourth generation Palestinian immigrants.

=== Syrian ===
Most Syrian Colombians came to Colombia in the late 19th and early 20th century, with notable populations in Córdoba, Cartagena, and other cities.

== Notable people ==
- Yamid Amat, journalist; (born 1941).
- Fuad Char, 48th Governor of Atlántico Department, Minister of Economic Development, and senator. His father immigrated to Colombia from Damascus, Syria; (born 1937).
- Yannai Kadamani, dancer, professor, politician, and Minister of Culture since 2025. She is of Lebanese descent; (born 1993).
- Shakira, singer-songwriter. Her great-grandmother immigrated to Colombia from Lebanon; (born 1977).
- Susana Muhamad, political scientist, environmentalist, and politician. She is a member of Humane Colombia who served as Minister of Environment and Sustainable Development from 2022 to 2025. She is of Palestinian descent; (born 1977).
- Julio César Turbay Ayala, 25th President of Colombia. His father, Antonio Amín Turbay immigrated to Colombia from Tannourine, Lebanon; (1916–2005).
- Diana Turbay, journalist kidnapped by the Medellín Cartel and killed in a botched rescue operation. Her grandfather immigrated to Colombia from Tannourine, Lebanon; (1950–1991).
- Gabriel Turbay, 1946 presidential candidate, representative, and senator. His parents were immigrants from Lebanon; (1901–1947).
- Nydia Quintero Turbay, former First Lady of Colombia; (born 1932).

== See also ==
- Arab diaspora
- Lebanese Colombians
- Lebanese diaspora
- Palestinian diaspora
- Syrian Colombians
- Syrian diaspora
- Race and ethnicity in Colombia
- White Colombians
