= Zibechi =

Zibechi is a surname. Notable people with the surname include:

- Alfredo Zibechi (1895–1958), Uruguayan footballer
- Raúl Zibechi (born 1952), Uruguayan journalist, writer, militant, and political theorist
