= Colombians =

People of Colombia

Colombians Colombianos
- Map of the Colombian Diaspora in the World

Total population
- c. 60 million (2026 estimate); Diaspora c. 5.5 million 0.8% of world's population

Regions with significant populations
- Colombia 53,474,637 (2026 estimate)
- United States: 1,936,065
- Spain: 978,041
- Venezuela: 721,791 (2011)
- Chile: 209,946
- Ecuador: 203,000
- Brazil: 120,136
- Argentina: 111,969
- Canada: 76,580
- Panama: 66,689
- Australia: 63,010
- Peru: 53,852
- France: 40,000
- United Kingdom: 39,000
- Mexico: 36,234
- Costa Rica: 28,015
- Germany: 36,000
- Netherlands: 20,515
- Italy: 19,848
- Poland: 16,389
- Sweden: 15,128
- Aruba: 8,067
- Puerto Rico: 5,266
- Curaçao: 4,166
- Japan: 2,701
- Saudi Arabia: 614
- Iceland: 344

Languages
- Primarily Colombian Spanish and Indigenous Languages, as well as other minority languages

Religion
- Predominantly Roman Catholic; Protestant minority See Religion in Colombia

Related ethnic groups
- Other Latin Americans

Colombians (Spanish: Colombianos) are people identified with the country of Colombia. This connection may be residential, legal, historical or cultural. For most Colombians, several (or all) of these connections exist and are collectively the source of their being Colombian.

Colombia is considered to be one of the most multiethnic societies in the world, home to people of various ethnic, religious and national origins. Many Colombians have varying degrees of European, Indigenous, African, Arab, Asian and Jew ancestry.

The majority of the Colombian population is Mestizo and Castizo, being the mixed descendants of Indigenous peoples, Africans, and Europeans, especially Iberians. Following the initial period of Spanish conquest and immigration, different waves of immigration and settlement of non-Indigenous peoples took place over the course of nearly six centuries and continue today. Elements of Native American and more recent immigrant customs, languages and religions have combined to form the culture of Colombia and thus a modern Colombian identity.

== Ethnic groups ==
Ethnic groups of Colombia according to Latinobarómetro 2023
1. Mestizo (50.3%)
2. White (26.4%)
3. Indigenous (9.50%)
4. African (9.00%)
5. Mulatto (4.40%)
6. Asian (0.40%)

=== European Colombians ===
Most of Colombia's population descends from European immigration in the mid 16th to late 20th centuries. The greatest waves of European immigration to Colombia can generally be divided into three time periods: the 1820s-1850s, which brought hundreds of immigrants mainly from Spain, Italy, Germany (including Ashkenazi Jewish); the 1880s to 1910s, which brought many immigrants from France, Portugal, Belgium, Astro-Hungary, Denmark, Croatia, and Switzerland; and the 1920s-1960s, the last great wave of European immigration to Colombia, which brought many British (including Irish) immigrants, as well as other European groups such as the Dutch, Polish, Russian, Scandinavian, and other Eastern European immigrants who primarily settled in Colombia's great urban centers. These immigrants came to Colombia attracted by the country's growing population and business opportunities. In addition to these waves of immigration, a great number of Jews fled to Colombia during and after the Second World War, seeking to escape violence in Europe. Immigrants went mostly to the Caribbean and Andean regions. There are smaller numbers of Dutch, Swiss, Austrians, Danish, Norwegian, Portuguese, Belgian, Russian, Polish, Hungarian, Bulgarian, Lithuanian, Ukrainian, Czech, Greek and Croatian communities that immigrated during the Second World War and the Cold War.

=== Mestizo Colombians ===
Estimates of the Mestizo population, people of mixed European (mostly Spanish), Indigenous, and African ancestry in Colombia vary as the national census does not include Mestizo as an ethnic option. According to the 2018 census, the population of people who did not identify with any ethnic group, being mostly White or Mestizo, made up 87% of the Colombian population, while an estimated 40% of Colombians were Mestizo or mixed race. According to a genetic study published in PLOS Genetics, people who autoidentified as "Mestizo" in Colombia show a tri-hybrid ancestry profile characterized by approximately 62% European, 28% Indigenous American, and 6% African ancestry.

=== Indigenous Colombians ===
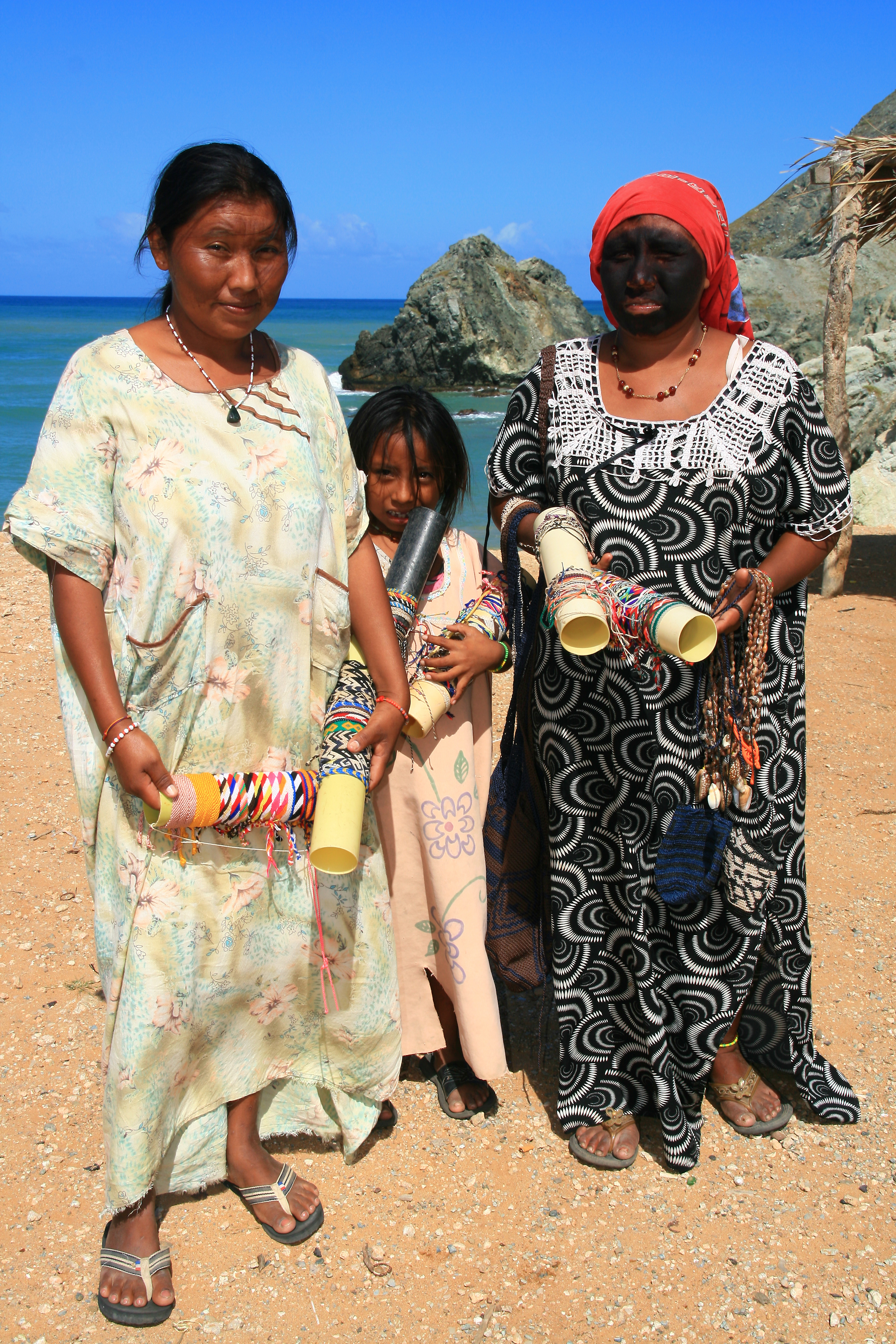
The Wayuu people represent the largest indigenous group in Colombia.

Originally, Colombia's territory was inhabited entirely by Indigenous groups. Colombia's indigenous cultures evolved from three main groups—the Quimbaya, who inhabited the western slopes of the Cordillera Central; the Chibcha; and the Kalina. The Muisca culture, a subset of the larger Chibcha ethnic group, were famous for their use of gold and responsible for the legend of El Dorado. Today, Indigenous people comprise roughly around 10% of the population in Colombia. More than fifty different indigenous ethnic groups inhabit Colombia. Most of them speak languages belonging to the Chibchan and Cariban language families.

Historically, there are 567 reserves (resguardos) established for Indigenous peoples which are inhabited by more than 800,000 people. The 1991 constitution established that their native languages are official in their territories, and most of them have bilingual education systems, teaching both native languages and Spanish. Some of the largest indigenous groups in Colombia are the Wayuu, Zenú, Pastos, Embera, and Páez. The departments with the biggest indigenous populations are Cauca, La Guajira, Nariño, Córdoba and Sucre.

=== Afro-Colombians ===
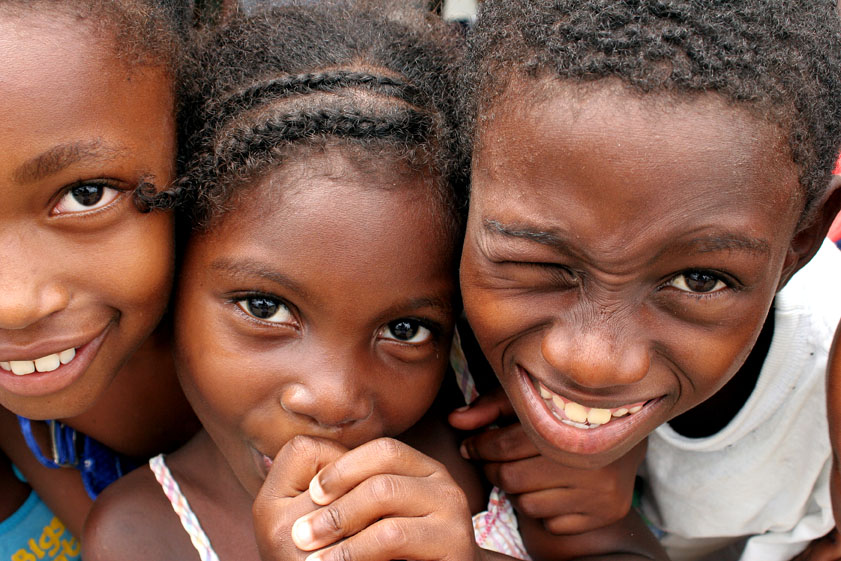
Afro-Colombian children

Also known as "Afro", or "Afro-colombianos" (in Spanish). According to the 2018 census, they are 5.34% of country population, while genetic studies have obtained between 6.6%, 9.2, and 11% of African DNA in the Colombian population. Also the percentage and numbers of Afro-Colombians can vary depending on the region, being the majority population in the Pacific Region, frequently found in the Caribbean Region but a minority in the Andean Region, Orinoquia Region and Amazon Region. Colombia has the fourth-largest African diaspora on the planet after the Brazil, the United States, and Haiti.

=== Asian Colombians ===
Asian Colombians (Spanish: colombianos asiáticos; Latin American Spanish: [/kolombjanos/ /aˈsjatikos/]) are Asian immigrants in Colombia and their descendants. The majority of Asian Colombians are of Chinese and Japanese descent, with a smaller portion being of Korean descent. There are also notable South Asian, Southeast Asian, Arab, and Middle Eastern descending populations.

A study by Latinobarómetro in 2023 estimated that 0.4% of Colombians are Asian, this would equate to around 200,000 of Colombia's population of approximately 50 million people.

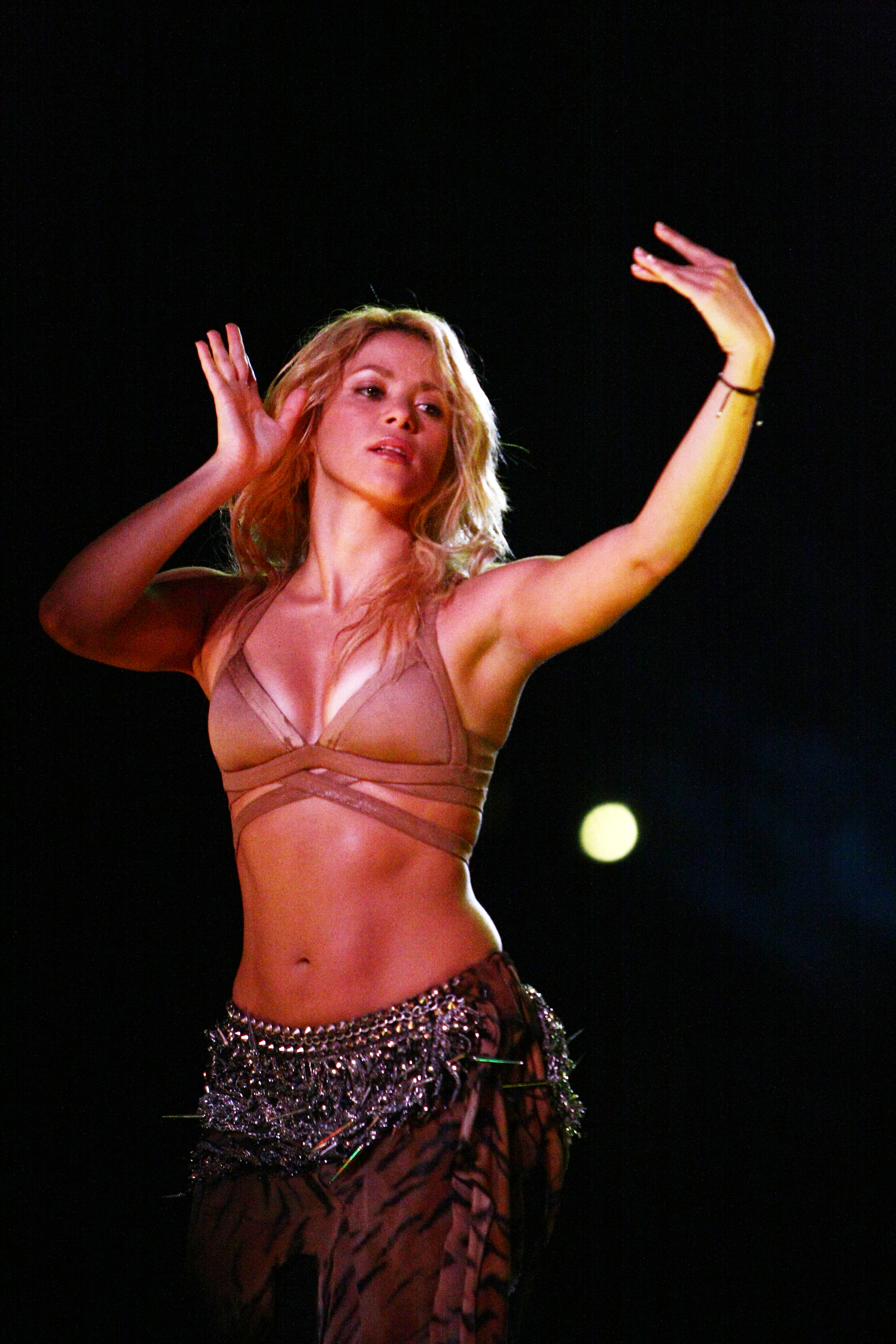
The Colombian singer Shakira is of Lebanese, Spanish and Italian descent.

==== Arab Colombians ====
Most of whom were described as "Syrian-Lebanese" migrants established themselves in the Caribbean Region of Colombia, in cities and towns near the basin of the Magdalena River such as Maicao, Riohacha, Santa Marta, Lorica, Fundación, Aracataca, Ayapel, Calamar, Ciénaga, Cereté, Montería, Valledupar, Sincelejo and Barranquilla. The population later expanded to other areas, and by 1945, there were Arab Middle Easterners moving inland to areas such as Ocaña, Cúcuta, Barrancabermeja, Ibagué, Girardot, Honda, Tunja, Villavicencio, Pereira, Soatá, Neiva, Buga, Chaparral and Chinácota.

The five major cities where the Levantine Middle Eastern population was present were Santa Marta, Barranquilla, Cartagena, Bogotá and Cali. Most arrived as members of the Eastern Orthodox and Eastern Catholic churches, but the majority became Roman Catholic. Estimates of the number of immigrants entering the country in 1945 vary from 40,000 to 50,000; most of these immigrants were Christian and a minority were Muslim.

Many Arabs adapted their names and surnames to the Spanish language as a way to adapt more quickly in the communities where they arrived. For example, people of Arab origin took surnames such as Guerra (originally Harb), Domínguez (Ñeca), Durán (Doura), Lara (Larach), and Cristo (Salibe).

=== Jewish Colombians ===
There are about 8,000 Colombians of Jewish origin who practice Judaism, most of them live in Bogotá. Colombia's Jewish community includes Sephardi Jews from countries such as Syria and Turkey also immigrated to the country and run their independent religious organizations. The Confederación de Comunidades Judías de Colombia coordinates Jews and institutions that practice the religion.

=== Genetic composition ===
Genetic composition of Colombians according to the DNA Tribes study (2012).
1. Caucasian (56.7%) (56.7%)
2. Amerindian (26.2%) (26.2%)
3. Arab (8.5%) (8.50%)
4. African (8.0%) (8.00%)
5. Asian (0.6%) (0.60%)

== Immigrant groups ==
Because of its strategic location, Colombia has received several immigration waves during its history. Most of these immigrants have settled in the Caribbean Coast; Barranquilla (the largest city in the Colombian Caribbean Coast) and other Caribbean cities have the largest population of Lebanese, German, British, French, Italian, Irish and Romani descendants. There are also important communities of American and Chinese descendants in the Andean Region and Caribbean Coast especially in Medellin, Bogota, Cali, Barranquilla and Cartagena. Most immigrants are Venezuelans, they are evenly distributed throughout the country.

== Languages ==
There are 101 languages listed for Colombia in the Ethnologue database, of which 80 are spoken today as living languages. There are currently more than 850,000 speakers of native languages.

== Education ==
The educational experience of many Colombian children begins with attendance at a preschool academy until age five (Educación preescolar). Basic education (Educación básica) is compulsory by law. It has two stages: Primary basic education (Educación básica primaria) which goes from first to fifth grade – children from six to ten years old, and Secondary basic education (Educación básica secundaria), which goes from sixth to ninth grade. Basic education is followed by Middle vocational education (Educación media vocacional) that comprises the tenth and eleventh grades. It may have different vocational training modalities or specialties (academic, technical, business, and so on.) according to the curriculum adopted by each school.

After the successful completion of all the basic and middle education years, a high-school diploma is awarded. The high-school graduate is known as a bachiller, because secondary basic school and middle education are traditionally considered together as a unit called bachillerato (sixth to eleventh grade). Students in their final year of middle education take the ICFES test (now renamed Saber 11) in order to gain access to higher education (Educación superior). This higher education includes undergraduate professional studies, technical, technological and intermediate professional education, and post-graduate studies.

Bachilleres (high-school graduates) may enter into a professional undergraduate career program offered by a university; these programs last up to five years (or less for technical, technological and intermediate professional education, and post-graduate studies), even as much to six to seven years for some careers, such as medicine. In Colombia, there is not an institution such as college; students go directly into a career program at a university or any other educational institution to obtain a professional, technical or technological title. Once graduated from the university, people are granted a (professional, technical or technological) diploma and licensed (if required) to practice the career they have chosen. For some professional career programs, students are required to take the Saber-Pro test, in their final year of undergraduate academic education.

Public spending on education as a proportion of gross domestic product in 2012 was 4.4%. This represented 15.8% of total government expenditure. In 2012, the primary and secondary gross enrolment ratios stood at 106.9% and 92.8% respectively. School-life expectancy was 13.2 years. A total of 93.6% of the population aged 15 and older were recorded as literate, including 98.2% of those aged 15–24.

== Religion ==
The National Administrative Department of Statistics (DANE) does not collect religious statistics, and accurate reports are difficult to obtain. However, based on various studies and a survey, about 90% of the population adheres to Christianity, the majority of which (70.9%) are Roman Catholic, while a significant minority (16.7%) adhere to Protestantism (primarily Evangelicalism). Some 4.7% of the population is atheist or agnostic, while 3.5% claim to believe in God but do not follow a specific religion. 1.8% of Colombians adhere to Jehovah's Witnesses and Adventism and less than 1% adhere to other religions, such as Islam, Judaism, Buddhism, Mormonism, Hinduism, Hare Krishna movement, Rastafari movement, Eastern Orthodox Church, and spiritual studies. The remaining people either did not respond or replied that they did not know. In addition to the above statistics, 35.9% of Colombians reported that they did not practice their faith actively. 1,519,562 people in Colombia, or around 3% of the population reported following an Indigenous religion.

While Colombia remains a mostly Roman Catholic country by baptism numbers, the 1991 Colombian constitution guarantees freedom and equality of religion.

== Diaspora Politics ==
=== 2026 ===
Country	First round	Second round	
Country	Algeria	Fajardo	Cepeda
Argentina	Cepeda	Cepeda	
Aruba	De La Espriella	De La Espriella	
Australia	Cepeda	Cepeda	
Austria	Cepeda	Cepeda	
Azerbaijan	Cepeda	Cepeda	
Belgium	Cepeda	Cepeda	
Bolivia	De La Espriella	De La Espriella	
Brazil	Cepeda	Cepeda	
Canada	De La Espriella	De La Espriella	
Chile	De La Espriella	De La Espriella	
China	De La Espriella	De La Espriella	
Costa Rica	De La Espriella	De La Espriella	
Cuba	Cepeda	De La Espriella	
Curacao	De La Espriella	De La Espriella	
Denmark	Cepeda	Cepeda	
Dominican Republic	De La Espriella	De La Espriella	
Ecuador	De La Espriella	De La Espriella	
Egypt	De La Espriella	De La Espriella	
El Salvador	De La Espriella	De La Espriella	
Finland	Cepeda	Cepeda	
France	Cepeda	Cepeda	
Germany	Cepeda	Cepeda	
Ghana	Cepeda	Cepeda	
Guatemala	De La Espriella	De La Espriella	
Haiti	Cepeda	Cepeda	
Honduras	De La Espriella	De La Espriella	
Hungary	Cepeda	Cepeda	
India	De La Espriella	Cepeda	
Indonesia	Valencia	De La Espriella	
Ireland	Cepeda	Cepeda	
Israel	De La Espriella	De La Espriella	
Italy	Cepeda	Cepeda	
Jamaica	De La Espriella	De La Espriella	
Japan	De La Espriella	De La Espriella	
Kenya	Cepeda	Cepeda	
Lebanon	De La Espriella	De La Espriella	
Malaysia	De La Espriella	Cepeda	
Mexico	De La Espriella	De La Espriella	
Morocco	De La Espriella	Cepeda	
Netherlands	Cepeda	Cepeda	
New Zealand	Cepeda	Cepeda	
Nicaragua	De La Espriella	De La Espriella	
Norway	Cepeda	Cepeda	
Panama	De La Espriella	De La Espriella	
Paraguay	De La Espriella	De La Espriella	
Peru	De La Espriella	De La Espriella	
Philippines	De La Espriella	De La Espriella	
Poland	Cepeda	Cepeda	
Portugal	Cepeda	Cepeda	
Puerto Rico	De La Espriella	De La Espriella	
Russia	Cepeda	Cepeda	
Singapore	De La Espriella	De La Espriella	
South Africa	De La Espriella	De La Espriella	
South Korea	De La Espriella	De La Espriella	
Spain	Cepeda	Cepeda	
Sweden	Cepeda	Cepeda	
Switzerland	Cepeda	Cepeda	
Thailand	De La Espriella	De La Espriella	
Trinidad and Tobago	De La Espriella	De La Espriella	
Turkey	Cepeda	Cepeda	
United Arab Emirates	De La Espriella	De La Espriella	
United Kingdom	De La Espriella	De La Espriella	
United States	De La Espriella	De La Espriella	
Uruguay	De La Espriella	De La Espriella	
Venezuela	De La Espriella	De La Espriella	
Vietnam	Cepeda	Cepeda	
Source: Registraduria

=== 2022 ===
==== First round ====
Department	Petro		Hernández		Gutiérrez		Fajardo		Rodríguez		Gómez		Betancourt		Pérez		Blank votes	
Department	Votes	%	Votes	%	Votes	%	Votes	%	Votes	%	Votes	%	Votes	%	Votes	%	Votes	%
Consulates/Abroad	95,850	31.60%	42,118	13.88%	136,511	45.01%	23,323	7.69%	1,689	0.55%	754	0.24%	273	0.09%	118	0.03%	2,628	0.86%
Source: Registraduria

==== Second round ====
Department	Petro		Hernández		Blank votes	
Department	Votes	%	Votes	%	Votes	%
Consulates	114,610	37.52%	185,557	60.75%	5,209	1.72%
Source: Registraduria

=== Abroad vote ===
==== First round ====
Country	Petro %	Hernández %	Gutiérrez %	Fajardo %	Rodríguez %	Gómez %	Betancourt %	Pérez %
Algeria	–	–	50.00	50.00	–	–	–	–
Argentina	63.62	12.16	15.88	6.26	0.63	0.17	0.07	0.03
Australia	54.50	16.82	15.99	10.51	0.43	0.16	0.05	–
Austria	58.58	8.28	17.90	13.52	0.12	0.12	0.24	0.12
Azerbaijan	38.09	9.52	38.09	14.28	–	–	–	–
Belgium	55.42	9.19	21.51	11.79	0.26	0.13	0.26	0.06
Bolivia	30.81	21.22	41.02	4.48	1.02	0.81	–	–
Brazil	52.71	11.16	25.16	9.32	0.25	0.21	0.08	0.04
Canada	36.93	14.60	36.39	10.03	0.52	0.26	0.08	0.01
Chile	49.36	16.67	25.24	6.09	0.79	0.43	0.07	0.07
China	45.16	11.98	28.11	11.52	–	–	0.46	–
Costa Rica	21.27	15.45	54.82	7.21	0.33	0.30	0.05	0.02
Cuba	74.58	11.66	10.62	1.66	0.20	0.20	–	–
Denmark	56.98	4.46	17.31	20.39	0.27	–	–	–
Dominican Republic	19.64	13.79	54.62	9.39	0.84	0.46	0.15	0.07
Ecuador	30.64	17.96	42.44	5.45	0.94	0.54	0.41	0.15
Egypt	48.48	6.00	30.30	15.15	–	–	–	–
El Salvador	22.22	12.45	53.53	9.76	1.01	–	–	–
Finland	62.12	8.53	16.26	10.56	0.40	–	–	–
France	57.67	10.47	16.99	13.04	0.36	0.18	0.06	0.01
Germany	59.40	7.26	14.21	17.07	0.36	0.24	0.10	–
Ghana	32.43	13.51	32.43	16.21	–	–	–	–
Guatemala	15.82	16.57	56.62	8.61	0.64	0.43	–	0.21
Honduras	21.80	13.82	55.85	7.97	–	–	–	–
Hungary	62.24	9.18	16.83	9.69	1.02	–	0.51	0.51
India	34.78	4.34	47.82	8.69	–	–	–	–
Indonesia	36.00	8.00	34.00	20.00	–	–	–	–
Ireland	41.60	11.31	29.19	16.78	–	0.36	0.36	–
Israel	25.94	19.24	46.23	5.23	1.67	0.41	–	–
Italy	43.21	16.97	27.00	10.21	0.48	0.27	0.17	0.10
Jamaica	15.47	20.23	46.42	11.90	2.38	–	–	–
Japan	39.56	9.03	37.07	10.28	1.55	0.62	0.62	–
Kenya	41.66	5.55	33.33	19.44	–	–	–	–
Lebanon	6.04	12.08	71.81	6.71	0.67	1.34	–	–
Luxembourg	35.59	11.86	22.03	26.27	0.84	0.84	–	–
Malaysia	24.65	20.54	39.72	12.32	–	–	–	–
Mexico	35.67	10.13	40.65	11.93	0.41	0.25	0.05	0.04
Morocco	47.82	4.34	17.39	30.43	–	–	–	–
Netherlands	31.32	18.35	39.55	8.93	0.61	0.14	0.10	0.12
New Zealand	50.18	17.09	16.72	12.30	0.36	0.24	0.12	–
Nicaragua	23.91	20.65	57.17	3.26	–	–	–	–
Norway	60.46	7.97	15.94	13.28	0.33	0.33	0.33	–
Panama	21.52	16.27	52.73	7.47	0.74	0.35	0.11	0.02
Paraguay	19.81	17.11	51.35	8.10	1.80	–	–	0.45
Peru	26.78	17.12	43.29	10.44	0.94	0.37	0.12	0.04
Philippines	31.81	18.18	30.30	15.15	–	–	1.51	–
Poland	62.67	8.61	17.70	8.13	–	1.91	–	–
Portugal	49.12	11.72	24.72	11.25	0.95	0.47	–	–
Russia	78.18	9.69	9.09	1.81	–	–	–	–
Singapore	21.85	11.92	40.39	23.17	–	–	0.66	–
South Africa	32.18	4.59	48.27	12.64	–	–	–	–
South Korea	47.16	13.20	22.64	13.83	–	0.62	–	–
Spain	47.59	16.28	27.22	6.39	0.77	0.21	0.16	0.05
Sweden	60.77	8.14	17.87	11.12	0.79	0.29	0.09	–
Switzerland	49.36	8.59	28.42	11.93	0.51	0.33	0.11	0.03
Thailand	34.78	15.94	24.63	24.63	–	–	–	–
Trinidad and Tobago	30.00	20.00	35.00	11.66	–	–	1.66	–
Turkey	61.83	3.05	28.24	5.34	1.52	–	–	–
United Arab Emirates	14.52	40.50	39.62	4.52	–	0.12	–	–
United Kingdom	40.01	16.03	31.21	10.71	0.56	0.13	0.09	0.06
United States	16.12	11.97	64.28	6.31	0.44	0.22	0.04	0.02
Uruguay	50.47	15.37	22.58	9.10	0.37	0.75	–	–
Venezuela	14.43	34.36	44.87	3.46	1.40	0.53	0.09	0.03
Vietnam	50.00	7.69	15.38	19.23	–	3.84	–	–
Source: Registraduria

==== Second round ====
Country	Petro %	Hernández %
Algeria	33.33	50.00
Argentina	72.45	25.75
Australia	65.72	31.59
Austria	72.68	24.06
Azerbaijan	42.10	52.63
Belgium	67.22	30.14
Bolivia	35.28	63.70
Brazil	62.47	35.96
Canada	44.94	52.70
Chile	56.95	41.17
China	50.00	44.26
Costa Rica	25.47	72.88
Cuba	81.48	17.23
Denmark	73.82	22.05
Dominican Republic	26.56	70.96
Ecuador	37.65	60.47
Egypt	57.50	42.50
El Salvador	29.96	66.44
Finland	73.14	24.07
France	70.12	27.30
Ghana	51.61	38.70
Germany	74.38	23.08
Guatemala	23.18	74.58
Honduras	25.26	73.15
Hungary	76.41	20.51
India	35.00	35.00
Indonesia	50.00	47.82
Ireland	55.47	41.50
Israel	31.77	64.83
Italy	54.09	43.47
Jamaica	26.13	72.72
Japan	49.40	47.92
Kenya	62.50	37.50
Lebanon	17.47	81.55
Luxembourg	56.25	37.50
Malaysia	36.50	61.90
Morocco	43.47	30.43
Mexico	43.19	54.07
Nicaragua	25.96	71.15
Norway	68.91	28.04
New Zealand	64.41	31.88
Netherlands	39.08	58.96
Panama	27.66	70.92
Paraguay	24.65	73.51
Peru	34.15	63.98
Poland	68.50	29.50
Portugal	62.09	36.37
Philippines	49.12	45.61
Russia	84.75	13.41
Singapore	34.04	61.70
South Africa	33.33	64.19
South Korea	64.18	33.10
Spain	55.93	41.95
Sweden	68.67	28.76
Switzerland	59.22	38.74
Thailand	50.98	43.13
Trinidad and Tobago	36.50	60.31
Turkey	67.21	31.96
United Arab Emirates	17.83	80.79
United Kingdom	47.60	50.01
United States	19.20	79.73
Uruguay	59.13	38.11
Venezuela	18.77	80.19
Vietnam	53.84	38.46
Source: Registraduria

=== 2018 ===
==== First round ====
Department	Duque		Petro		Fajardo		Vargas		De la Calle		Trujillo		Morales		Blank votes	
Department	Votes	%	Votes	%	Votes	%	Votes	%	Votes	%	Votes	%	Votes	%	Votes	%
Consulates/Abroad	152,432	54.68%	34,395	12.33%	73,833	26.48%	10,440	3.74%	4,223	1.51%	398	0.14%	400	0.14%	2,614	0.93%
Sources: El Tiempo, Registraduría, Adam Carr

==== Second round ====
Department	Duque		Petro		Blank votes	
Department	Votes	%	Votes	%	Votes	%
Consulates/Abroad	180,995	69.91%	69,558	26.86%	8,340	3.22%
Sources: El Tiempo, Adam Carr

=== 2014 ===
==== First round ====
Department	Zuluaga		Santos		Ramírez		Obregón		Peñalosa		Blank votes	
Department	Votes	%	Votes	%	Votes	%	Votes	%	Votes	%	Votes	%
Consulates/Abroad	41,370	41.24%	25,121	25.04%	5,350	5.33%	10,010	9.97%	14,015	13.97%	4,444	4.43%
Source: Registraduría Nacional del Estado Civil

==== Second round ====
Department	Santos		Zuluaga		Blank votes	
Department	Votes	%	Votes	%	Votes	%
Consulates/Abroad	43,870	39.66%	63,887	57.75%	2,851	2.57%
Source: Registraduría Nacional del Estado Civil

=== 2006 ===
Department	Uribe		Gaviria		Serpa		Mockus		Pajero		Leyva		Rincón		Blank votes	
Department	Votes	%	Votes	%	Votes	%	Votes	%	Votes	%	Votes	%	Votes	%	Votes	%
Consulates/Abroad	101,459	84.17%	12,204	10.12%	2,866	2.38%	2,887	2.40%	150	0.12%	51	0.04%	76	0.06%	847	0.70
Source: RNEC

== See also ==
- List of Colombians
- Emigration from Colombia
- Culture of Colombia
- Colombia in popular culture
