= List of diplomatic missions in Colombia =

This is a list of diplomatic missions in Colombia. There are currently 64 embassies in Bogotá. Some other countries have non resident embassies.

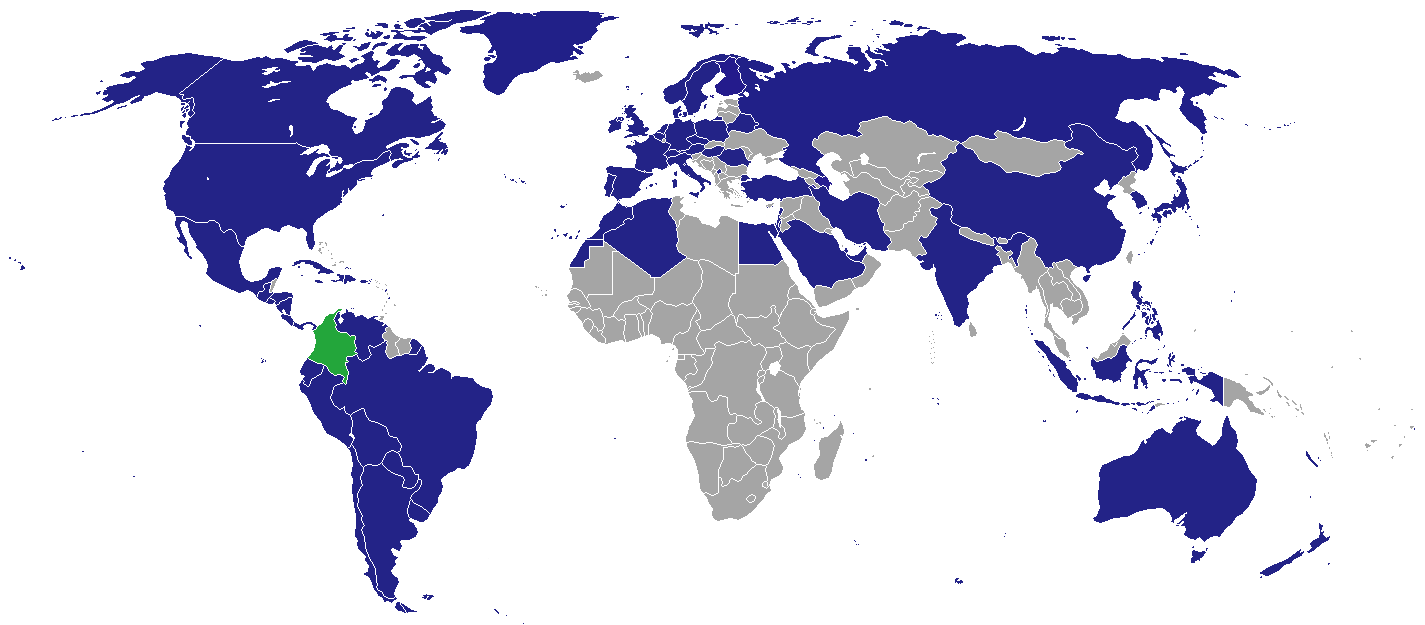
Diplomatic missions in Colombia Colombia Countries with embassies in Colombia Countries with consulates-general in Colombia

== Embassies in Bogotá ==
| Country | Mission type | Year established | Locality | Photo | Mission website |
|---|---|---|---|---|---|
| Algeria | Embassy | 1995 | Chapinero | | - |
| Argentina | Embassy | | Chapinero | | - |
| Australia | Embassy | 2017 | Usaquén | | - |
| Austria | Embassy | | Chapinero | | - |
| Azerbaijan | Embassy office | | Usaquén | | - |
| Belarus | Embassy | 2019 | | | - |
| Belgium | Embassy | | Chapinero | | - |
| Bolivia | Embassy | | Usaquén | | - |
| Brazil | Embassy | | Chapinero | | - |
| Canada | Embassy | 1953 | Usaquén | | - |
| Chile | Embassy | | Usaquén | | - |
| China | Embassy | | Chapinero | | - |
| Costa Rica | Embassy | | Usaquén | | - |
| Cuba | Embassy | | Chapinero | | - |
| Czech Republic | Embassy | 2014 | Chapinero | | - |
| Denmark | Embassy | 2014 | Chapinero | | - |
| Dominican Republic | Embassy | | Chapinero | | - |
| Ecuador | Embassy | | Chapinero | | - |
| Egypt | Embassy | | Usaquén | | - |
| El Salvador | Embassy | | Usaquén | | - |
| Finland | Embassy | 2017 | Usaquén | | - |
| France | Embassy | | Chapinero | | - |
| Germany | Embassy | | Usaquén | | - |
| Guatemala | Embassy | | Chapinero | | - |
| Haiti | Embassy | | Chapinero | | - |
| Holy See | Apostolic Nunciature | 1836 | Teusaquillo | | - |
| Honduras | Embassy | | Usaquén | | - |
| Hungary | Embassy | 2017 | Chapinero | | - |
| India | Embassy | | Usaquén | | - |
| Indonesia | Embassy | | Chapinero | | - |
| Ireland | Embassy | 2019 | Usaquén | | |
| Israel | Embassy | | Teusaquillo | | - |
| Italy | Embassy | | Chapinero | | - |
| Jamaica | Embassy | 1996 | Usaquén | | - |
| Japan | Embassy | | Chapinero | | - |
| Kosovo | Embassy | 2024 | | | - |
| Lebanon | Embassy | 1955 | Chapinero | | - |
| Mexico | Embassy | | Usaquén | | - |
| Morocco | Embassy | 1986 | Chapinero | | - |
| Netherlands | Embassy | | Chapinero | | - |
| New Zealand | Embassy | 2018 | Chapinero | | - |
| Nicaragua | Embassy | | Usaquén | | - |
| Norway | Embassy | 2012 | Chapinero | | - |
| Palestine | Embassy | | Teusaquillo | | - |
| Panama | Embassy | | Chapinero | | - |
| Paraguay | Embassy | | Chapinero | | - |
| Peru | Embassy | | Chapinero | | - |
| Philippines | Embassy | 2024 | Chapinero | | - |
| Poland | Embassy | | Usaquén | | - |
| Portugal | Embassy | | Chapinero | | - |
| Qatar | Embassy | | | | - |
| Romania | Embassy | 1973 | Chapinero | | - |
| Russia | Embassy | 1991 | Chapinero | | - |
| Saudi Arabia | Embassy | 2024 | | | - |
| South Korea | Embassy | 1962 | Chapinero | | |
| Sovereign Military Order of Malta | Embassy | 1957 | Usaquén | | - |
| Spain | Embassy | | Chapinero | | - |
| Sweden | Embassy | | Chapinero | | - |
| Switzerland | Embassy | | Chapinero | | - |
| Turkey | Embassy | | Chapinero | | - |
| United Arab Emirates | Embassy | | Chapinero | | - |
| United Kingdom | Embassy | | Chapinero | | - |
| United States | Embassy | | Teusaquillo | | - |
| Uruguay | Embassy | | Chapinero | | - |
| Venezuela | Embassy | | Chapinero | | - |

=== Other posts in Bogotá ===
- Catalonia (Delegation)
- European Union (Delegation)
- Quebec (Office)
- Taiwan (Commercial Office)

== Consular missions ==
=== Arauca ===
- Venezuela

=== Barranquilla ===
- Panama
- United States (Consular Agency)
- Venezuela

=== Bucaramanga ===
- Venezuela

=== Cartagena ===
- Venezuela

=== Cúcuta ===
- Venezuela

=== Ipiales ===
- Ecuador

=== Leticia ===
- Brazil (Vice-consulate)
- Peru

=== Medellín ===
- Peru
- Venezuela

=== Puerto Carreño ===
- Venezuela

=== Riohacha ===
- Venezuela

== Non-resident embassies accredited to Colombia ==
Brasília

- Angola
- Armenia
- Bangladesh
- Bahrain
- Botswana
- Cambodia
- Cameroon
- Cape Verde
- Congo-Kinshasa
- East Timor
- Estonia
- Equatorial Guinea
- Georgia
- Gabon
- Ghana
- Guinea
- Ivory Coast
- Jordan
- Kazakhstan
- Myanmar
- Namibia
- Oman
- North Korea
- Pakistan
- Senegal
- Serbia
- Singapore
- Slovakia
- Togo
- Tanzania

Caracas

- Greece
- Grenada
- Guyana
- Iraq
- Kuwait
- Libya
- Nigeria
- South Africa
- Suriname
- Syria
- Trinidad and Tobago
- Vietnam

Washington, D.C.

- Bahamas
- Burkina Faso
- Ethiopia
- Lesotho
- Madagascar
- Malawi
- Mali
- Nepal
- Turkmenistan
- Zimbabwe
- Zambia

New York City

- Bhutan
- Brunei
- Eritrea
- Gambia
- Liberia
- Maldives
- Nauru
- Papua New Guinea
- Rwanda
- Seychelles
- Sierra Leone
- Sri Lanka
- Sudan
- Somalia
- South Sudan
- Tonga
- Tajikistan
- Uganda
- Vanuatu
- Yemen

Resident elsewhere

- Albania (Buenos Aires)
- Afghanistan (Ottawa)
- Barbados (Panama City)
- Belize (Mexico City)
- Republic of the Congo (Havana)
- Iceland (Madrid)
- Kenya (Havana)
- Laos (Havana)
- Lithuania (Buenos Aires)
- Malaysia (Lima)
- Thailand (Lima)
- Ukraine (Lima)

== Closed missions ==
| Host city | Sending country | Mission | Year closed | Ref. |
|---|---|---|---|---|
| Bogotá | Bulgaria | Embassy | 1998 | |
| Bogotá | East Germany | Embassy | 1990 (Note: Existed as a commercial mission in between 1957 and 1973, when it opened as an embassy after formal diplomatic relations were established.) | |
| Bogotá | Iran | Embassy | 2026 | |
| Bogotá | Republic of China (Taiwan) | Embassy | 1980 | |
| Bogotá | Sahrawi Republic | Embassy | 2026 | |
| Barranquilla | China | Consulate | 2017 | |
| Barranquilla | Republic of China (Taiwan) | Consulate-General | 1980 | |
| Barranquilla | United Kingdom | Consulate | 1998 | |
| Cali | Ecuador | Consulate | 2013 | |
| Cali | United Kingdom | Consulate | 2014 | |
| Cartagena de Indias | Spain | Consulate General | 2020 | |
| Cartagena de Indias | United Kingdom | Consulate | 2014 | |
| Cartagena de Indias | United States | Consulate | 1948 | |
| Medellín | Argentina | Consulate-General | 1995 | |
| Medellín | Ecuador | Consulate | 2013 | |
| Medellín | France | Consulate | 2013 | |
| Puerto Asís | Ecuador | Consulate | 2013 | |

== See also ==
- List of diplomatic missions of Colombia
- Visa requirements for Colombian citizens
