= Mestizo Colombians =

Ethnic group

Colombianos mestizos (Spanish)

Total population
- Mixed ancestry predominates 49%–60% of the Colombian population

Regions with significant populations
- Throughout the nation, primarily in the Andean, Orinoco and Caribbean regions

Languages
- Predominantly Colombian Spanish

Religion
- Christianity (Catholic)

Related ethnic groups
- White Colombians, Native Colombians

Mestizo Colombians (Spanish: Colombianos mestizos) are Colombians of varying degrees of mixed European (mostly Spanish), Indigenous, and African ancestry.

== Numbers and distribution ==
The 2018 census reported that 87% of the population did not consider themselves part of a listed ethnic group, instead being mostly Mestizo and White.

External sources found Mestizos are the main racial group in Colombia, making up between 49% and 60% of country's population. Chibcha mestizos make up around 10 million people or 20% of Colombia's population. According to Latinobarometro in 2023, 50% of Colombians surveyed self-identified as Mestizos.

== Genetics ==
According to a genetic study published in PLOS Genetics, people who autoidentified as "Mestizo" in Colombia show an ancestry profile characterized by approximately 62% European, 28% Indigenous American, 6% African, and 4% Arab ancestry.

Genetic ancestry of Mestizo Colombians according to Ruiz-Linares et al. (2014)
1. European (62.0%)
2. Amerindian (28.0%)
3. African (6.00%)
4. Arab (4.00%)

A 2023 genetic study conducted by Criollo et al. estimated that the average admixture for Mestizo Colombians is 50.8% European, 40.7% Indigenous, and 8.5% African ancestry, however this varies significantly across regions of the country.

== See also ==
- Mestizo
- Race and ethnicity in Colombia
- White Colombians
- Indigenous peoples in Colombia
- Afro-Colombians
