= Basque Colombians =

Eusko-Kolonbiar; Vasco-Colombianos

Total population
- ~27,000,000 , Aprox 51–55% of the population

Regions with significant populations
- Throughout Colombia, especially Antioquia Department, Eje Cafetero, Bogotá, Valle del Cauca Department, Santander Department, Norte de Santander Department, Nariño Department, Caribbean region

Languages
- Colombian Spanish · Basque

Religion
- Roman Catholicism

A Basque Colombian (Spanish: Vasco-Colombiano, Basque: Eusko-Kolonbiar) is a person or resident born in Colombia of Basque descent. The term "Basque" may refer to ethnic Basques who immigrated to Colombia from the Basque Country. According to the Basque Government, Colombia has about 27 million basque descendants, making it home to the largest basque diaspora in the world. In genetic studies tracking the Iberian Y-chromosome haplogroup R1b-DF27 across Latin America, Colombia was found to have the highest concentration of this Basque-associated genetic marker in Latin America.

== Basques in the Paisa Region ==
The presence of Basque ancestry in the Paisa Region is exhibited by the proliferation of Basque surnames. Some scholars point out that this may be one of the regions of South America with the greatest concentration of ancestry from the Iberian region.

== See also ==
- Basque Argentine
- Basque Mexican
- Basque Americans
- Spanish Colombian
- White Latin American
