= San Sebastián de Urabá =

Settlement in Colombia

- Location within Colombia
- Coordinates: 8°25′38″N 76°47′04″W
- Country: Colombia

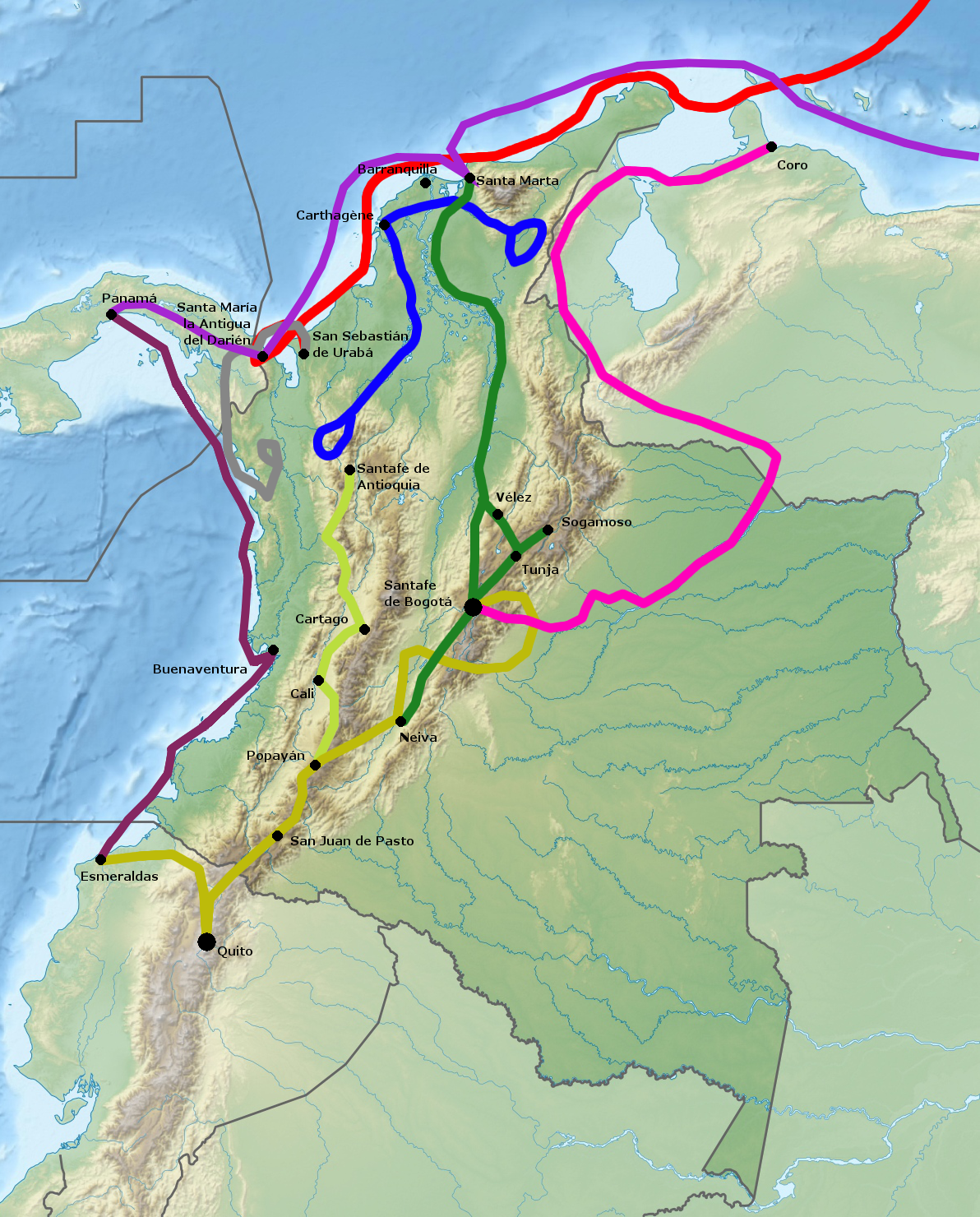

San Sebastián de Urabá was the first settlement established by Spaniards in the area of the Darién Gap in Colombia.

== Settlement ==
This fortified settlement was founded on 20 January 1510 by Alonso de Ojeda on the eastern coast of the Gulf of Urabá, in what is today Necoclí in the territory of the department of Antioquia, Colombia.

Towards the end of 1509, Alonso de Ojeda arrived in the Darién Gap as governor of the province of New Andalusia which included the Darién Gap. He was commanding an expedition that left Hispaniola, made up of 300 men, with which he founded the settlement of San Sebastián de Urabá, near the present locality of Necoclí, Antioquia. The native inhabitants were hostile to the Spaniards. They refused to trade food with them and frequently attacked them. Eight months after Ojeda left Hispaniola and founded San Sebastián, the situation in the fort was no longer tenable. Of the 300 men who had initially arrived with Ojeda only 42 survivors remained in the settlement.
