= Córdoba, Bolívar =

Córdoba
- Municipality and town
- Flag

- Location of the municipality and town of Córdoba, Bolívar in the Bolívar Department of Colombia

- Location in Colombia
- Coordinates: 9°35′12″N 74°49′38″W
- Country: Colombia
- Department: Bolívar Department

Area
  - Total: 573 km^{2} (221 sq mi)

Population (Census 2018)
  - Total: 15,012
  - Density: 26.2/km^{2} (67.9/sq mi)
- Time zone: UTC-5 (Colombia Standard Time)

Córdoba is a town and municipality located in the Bolívar Department, northern Colombia.

In September, 2017, the community suffered 4.2 magnitude earthquake.
