= Embassy of Palestine, Bogotá =

Diplomatic mission of Palestine in Colombia

Embassy of the State of Palestine, Bogotá
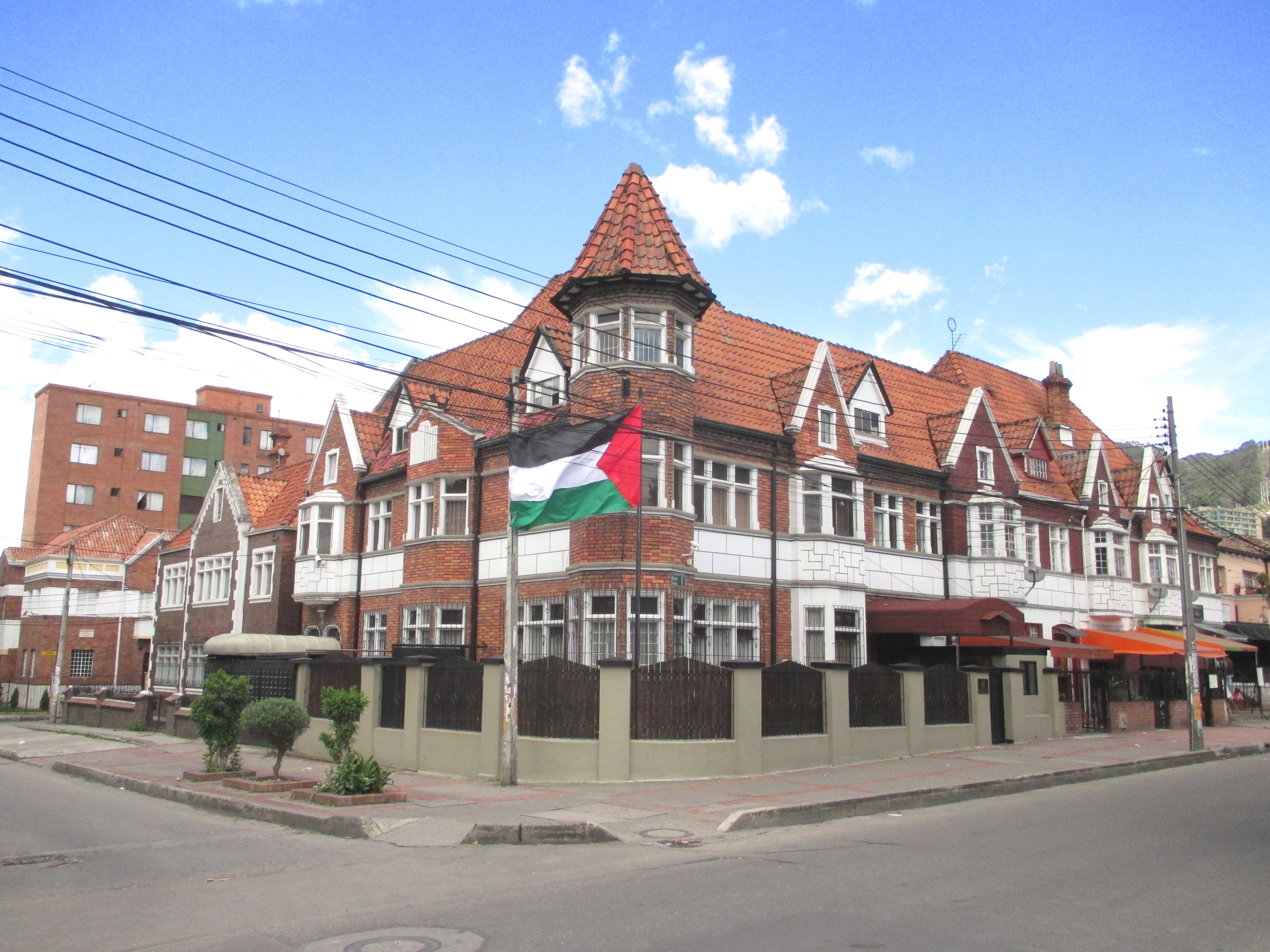
- Location: Teusaquillo, Bogotá, Colombia
- Address: Calle 45 Nº 14-76, Puente Aranda, Bogotá
- Coordinates: 4°37′58.40″N 74°4′6.74″W
- Opened: November 1996
- Ambassador: Raouf Al-Maliki
- Consul General: Rim Kanaan

The Embassy of the State of Palestine in Colombia is the diplomatic mission of Palestine in Colombia, located in the capital Bogotá. The Palestinian ambassador to Colombia is currently Raouf Al-Maliki and the consul is Rim Kanaan.

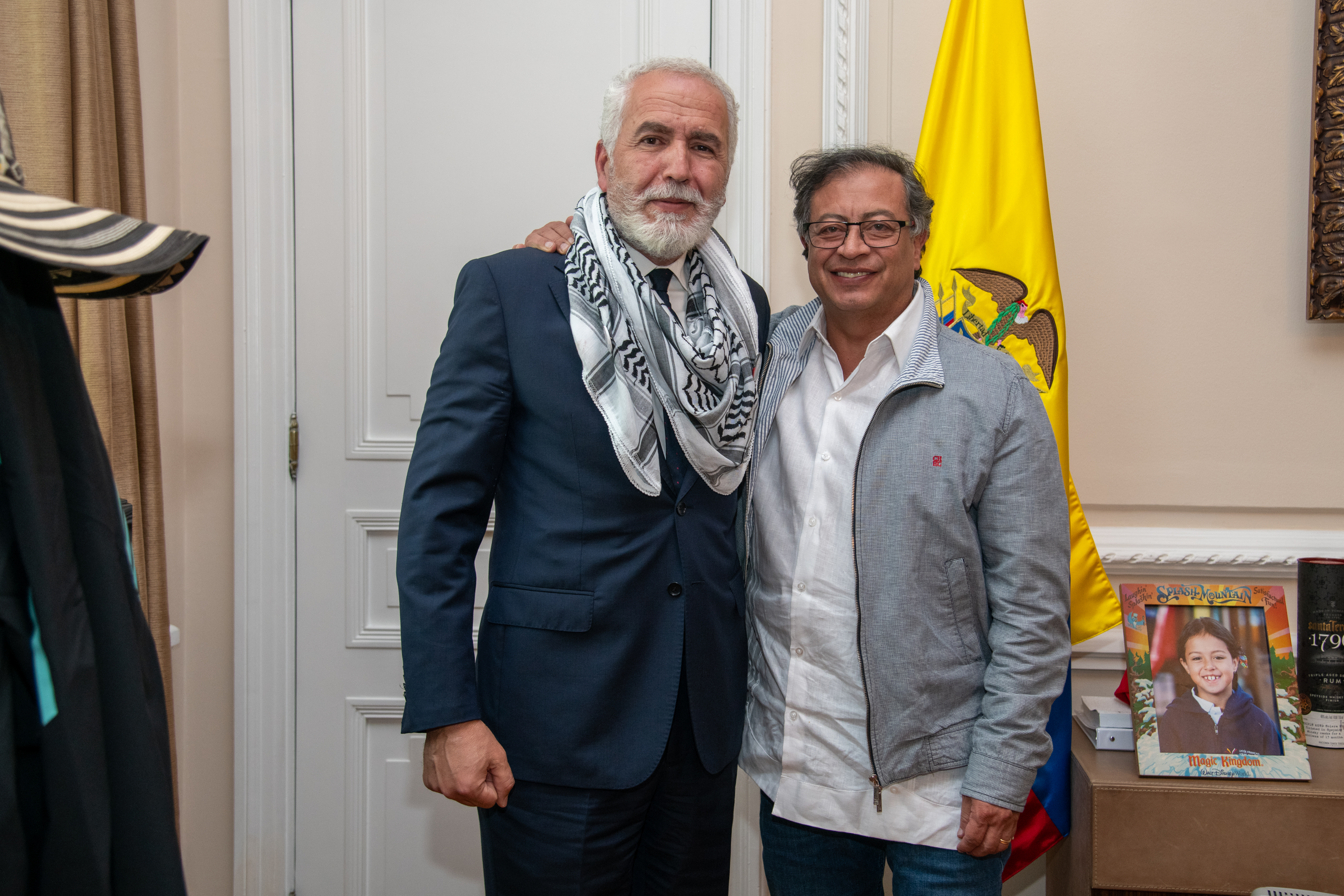
Raouf Al-Maliki, Ambassador of Palestine to Colombia, with Colombian president Gustavo Petro (2023)

== History ==
Although Colombia became the last South American country to recognize the State of Palestine in 2018, its embassy in Bogotá existed in some form for decades prior. From 1995 to 1998, Colombia’s president acted as chair of the Non-Aligned Movement (NAM) and in 1995 it hosted the organization's 11th summit in Cartagena. This was seen as a part of Colombia embracing a more third world perspective of international policy, which included a more open position on Palestine. Two years later, in 1997, Colombian President Ernesto Samper authorized the conversion of the Palestinian "press office" into the official permanent mission of Palestine in Bogotá. That same year, Samper traveled to Gaza as a part of his work with the NAM and met with Palestinian President Yasser Arafat and the Palestinian Legislative Council.

== Street 86 ==
On September 13, 2023, in coordination with the Embassy of Palestine, the Bogotá City Council inaugurated a portion of Street 86 (Spanish: Calle 86) between Carrera 7 and Carrera 11 as "Calle Estado de Palestina" in honor of the State of Palestine. This came after the passing of City Council Agreement 868, proposed by Humane Colombia's Ana Teresa Berna, and it's approval by then mayor Claudia López

== See also ==
- List of diplomatic missions of Palestine
- List of diplomatic missions in Colombia
- Foreign relations of Colombia
