= Calamar, Bolívar =

Calamar
- Municipality and town
- Flag

- Location of the municipality and town of Calamar in the Bolívar Department of Colombia

- Location in Colombia
- Coordinates: 10°15′0″N 74°54′57″W
- Country: Colombia
- Department: Bolívar Department
- Established: 1840

Population (Census 2018)
  - Total: 22,202

Calamar is a town and municipality located in the Bolívar Department, northern Colombia. The town is situated on the Magdalena River at the entrance of the Canal del Dique.

Calamar was founded in the republican period, under the government of the general Tomás Cipriano de Mosquera . The first inhabitants arrived in the year 1840, settled in the site that today is called Calamar (initially denominated Gamarra), in an extensive plain between the swamp of the Blacks and the Grande river of the Magdalena.
