= Latinobarómetro =

Private non-profit organization

Corporación barómetro barómetro Corporation
- Type: Non-profit
- Founder: Marta Lagos
- Headquarters: Santiago, Chile, Chile
- Services: Public opinion surveys

Latinobarómetro Corporation is a private non-profit organization, based in Providencia, Chile. It is responsible for carrying out barómetro, an annual public opinion survey that involves some 20,000 interviews in 18 Latin American countries, representing more than 600 million people. It observes the development of democracies, economies, and societies, using indicators of attitude, opinion, and behavior.
