= Ayapel =

Coordinates: 8°19′N 75°09′W

- Municipality and town
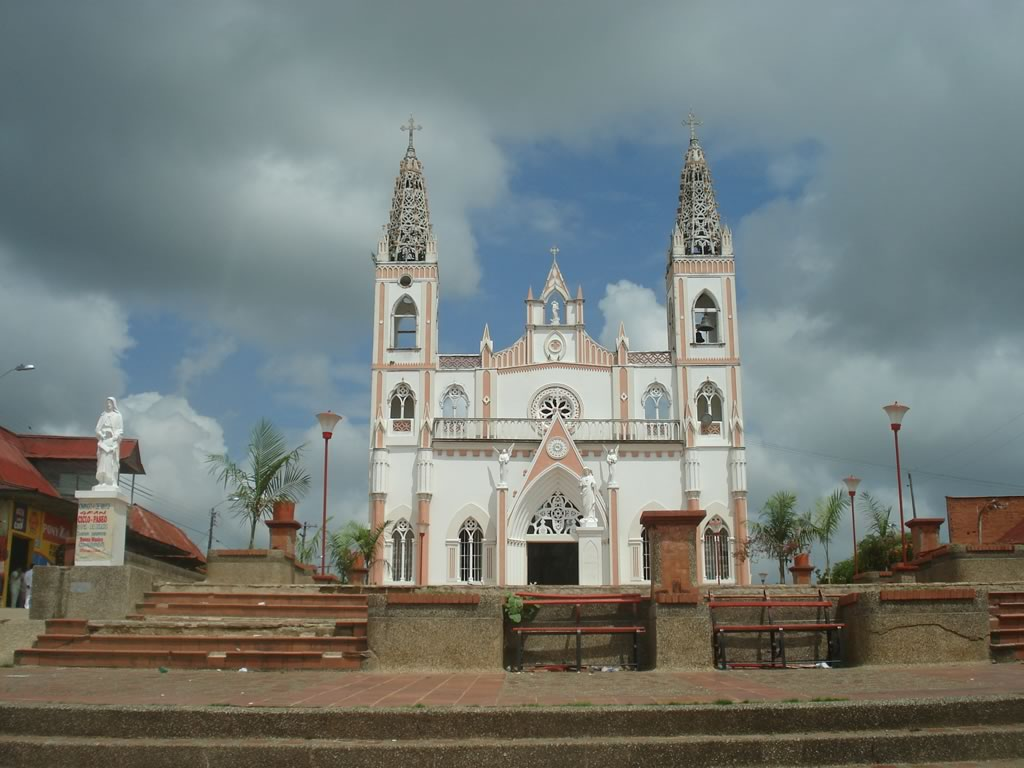

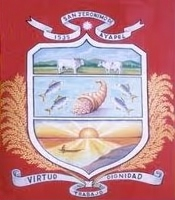
- Flag Coat of arms

- Location of the municipality and town of Ayapel in the Córdoba Department of Colombia.
- Country: Colombia
- Department: Córdoba Department

Area
  - Municipality and town: 1,965 km^{2} (759 sq mi)
  - Urban: 14.05 km^{2} (5.42 sq mi)

Population (2020 est.)
  - Municipality and town: 47,247
  - Density: 24.04/km^{2} (62.27/sq mi)
  - Urban: 27,729
  - Urban density: 1,974/km^{2} (5,112/sq mi)
- Time zone: UTC-5 (Colombia Standard Time)

Ayapel is a town and municipality located in the Córdoba Department, northern Colombia.

Ayapel is a Colombian municipality located in the far eastern department of Cordoba and bathed by the waters of San Jorge and Ayapel swamp. Bounded on the north by San Marcos, San Benito Abad, and Majagual, on the east by Guaranda and Achi, on the west by Buenavista and Montelibano, Pueblo Nuevo and south to the department of Antioquia. According to 2020 estimates, the population of Ayapel was 47,247.

== Climate ==
Climate data for Ayapel, elevation 22 m (72 ft), (1981–2010)
Month	Jan	Feb	Mar	Apr	May	Jun	Jul	Aug	Sep	Oct	Nov	Dec	Year
Mean daily maximum °C (°F)	33.1 (91.6)	33.9 (93.0)	34.3 (93.7)	33.9 (93.0)	32.9 (91.2)	32.6 (90.7)	32.6 (90.7)	32.4 (90.3)	32.0 (89.6)	31.9 (89.4)	32.0 (89.6)	32.4 (90.3)	32.8 (91.0)
Daily mean °C (°F)	27.8 (82.0)	28.4 (83.1)	28.6 (83.5)	28.4 (83.1)	27.9 (82.2)	27.9 (82.2)	27.8 (82.0)	27.7 (81.9)	27.5 (81.5)	27.3 (81.1)	27.4 (81.3)	27.7 (81.9)	27.8 (82.0)
Mean daily minimum °C (°F)	22.7 (72.9)	22.9 (73.2)	23.2 (73.8)	23.6 (74.5)	23.6 (74.5)	23.3 (73.9)	23.1 (73.6)	23.1 (73.6)	23.0 (73.4)	23.1 (73.6)	23.5 (74.3)	23.3 (73.9)	23.2 (73.8)
Average precipitation mm (inches)	18.1 (0.71)	28.8 (1.13)	49.1 (1.93)	162.9 (6.41)	267.2 (10.52)	290.9 (11.45)	380.7 (14.99)	397.2 (15.64)	326.9 (12.87)	266.8 (10.50)	198.7 (7.82)	51.7 (2.04)	2,439.1 (96.03)
Average precipitation days	2	3	5	11	16	17	19	20	18	17	14	7	145
Average relative humidity (%)	81	79	78	81	84	85	84	85	85	85	85	84	83
Mean monthly sunshine hours	182.9	152.4	139.5	120.0	130.2	129.0	170.5	161.2	141.0	139.5	138.0	155.0	1,759.2
Mean daily sunshine hours	5.9	5.4	4.5	4.0	4.2	4.3	5.5	5.2	4.7	4.5	4.6	5.0	4.8
Source: Instituto de Hidrologia Meteorologia y Estudios Ambientales
