= Raúl Zibechi =

Uruguayan writer and social activist (born 1952)

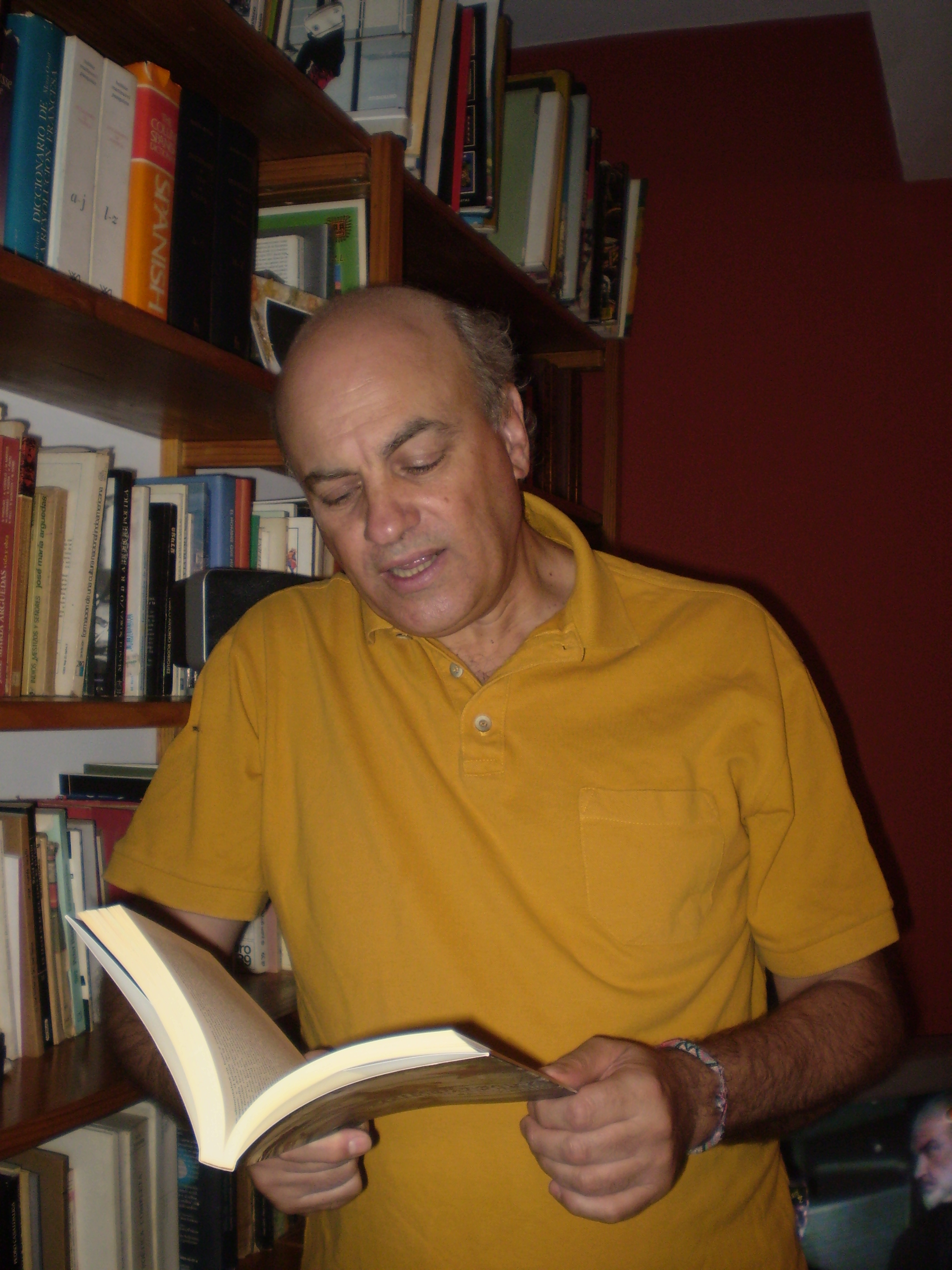

Raúl Zibechi (born January 25, 1952, in Montevideo, Uruguay) is a radio and print journalist, writer, militant and political theorist.

He has contributed to the weekly newspaper Brecha.

== Works ==
=== Books in Spanish ===
- The New Brazil (2014)
- Autonomies and Emancipations (2008)
- A Horizontal View: Social Movements and Emancipation (1999)
- The Youth Rebellion of the 1990s, Social Networks and the Creation of an Alternative Culture (1997)
- The Streams When They Run Low, the Challenges of Zapatismo (1995).

=== Books in English ===
His first book to be translated into English is Dispersing Powers: Social Movements as Anti-State Forces (AK Press, 2010). His book The New Brazil - Regional Imperialism and the New Democracy (AK Press, 2014) has also been translated into English by Ramor Ryan. His last translated book: Constructing Worlds Otherwise: Societies in Movement and Anticolonial Paths in Latin America (AK Press, 2024) translated into English by George Ygarza Quispe.

In the book's foreword, John Holloway comments:

"Zibechi goes to Bolivia to learn. Like us, he goes with questions, questions that stretch far beyond the borders of Bolivia. How do we change the world and create a different one? How do we get rid of capitalism? How do we create a society based on dignity? What is the role of the state and what are the possibilities of changing society through anti-state movements?... practical and theoretical questions that have risen from the struggles in Latin America and the world in the last fifteen years or so."

Additionally, Michael Hardt, co-author of Empire, Multitude, and Commonwealth, writes: "Raúl Zibechi recounts in wonderful detail how dynamic and innovative Bolivian social movements succeeded in transforming the country. Even more inspiring than the practical exploits, though, are the theoretical innovations of the movements, which Zibechi highlights, giving us new understandings of community, political organization, institution, and a series of other concepts vital to contemporary political thought."

His second book published in English is Territories in Resistance. A Cartography of Latin American Social Movements, (AK Press, 2012).

James C. Scott, author of The Art of Not Being Governed (2009) writes: "Zibechi show us not only that new worlds are possible but they exist and are constantly being invented in daily struggles throughout Latin America. A brilliantly original reformulation of the practices of popular action by a sophisticated, realistic, experienced, and daring observer of autonomous non-state spaces. More valuable than a 'six-foot shelf' of tomes on social movement theory".
