= Demographics of Colombia =

- Population pyramid of Colombia as of July 2026
- Population: 52,695,952 (2024 est.)
- Density: 46.15/km^{2} (119.5/sq mi) (2024 est.)
- Growth rate: ▲0.54%
- Birth rate: 8.3 births/1,000 population (2025)
- Death rate: 5.4 deaths/1,000 population (2025)
- Life expectancy: 74.9 years
  - male: 71.3 years
  - female: 78.7 years
- Fertility rate: 1.03 children born/woman (2025)
- Infant mortality: 11.7 deaths/1,000 live births (2024 est.)
- Net migration rate: ▼ −6.7 migrant(s)/1,000 population (2023)
- Immigrant share: 5.8% (2024)

Age structure
- 0–14 years: 18.32%
- 15–64 years: 69.10%
- 65 and over: 12.59%

Sex ratio
- Total: 1.03 male(s)/female
- At birth: 1.05 male(s)/female
- Under 15: 1.02 male(s)/female
- 15–64 years: 0.95 male(s)/female
- 65 and over: 0.75 male(s)/female

Nationality
- Nationality: Colombian
- Major ethnic: Undeclared (83.61%)
- Minor ethnic: Blacks (9.34%); Raizals (0.06%); Palenqueros (0.02%); Others (9.26%); Indigenous (4.31%); Wayuus (0.79%); Zenús (0.64%); Nasas (0.50%); Emberás (0.41%); Others (1.97%); Romanis (0.01%); Not specified (1.35%)

Language
- Official: Spanish
- Spoken: Languages of Colombia

The demographics of Colombia consist of statistics regarding Colombians' health, economic status, religious affiliations, ethnicity, population density, and other aspects of the population. Colombia is the second-most populous country in South America after Brazil, and the third-most populous in Latin America, after Brazil and Mexico.

Colombia's population has grown steadily for most of its history, although the growth rate slowed markedly in the late 20th century, due in part to emigration resulting from a sustained internal conflict. However, the economy has improved noticeably in recent decades, especially in urban areas, and living standards have risen in line with this.

== Population size and structure ==
Population history
Year	Pop.	±% p.a.
1500	6,000,000	—
1600	750,000	−2.06%
1700	800,000	+0.06%
1778	891,077	+0.14%
1810	1,400,000	+1.42%
1820	1,300,000	−0.74%
1825	1,327,000	+0.41%
1835	1,687,109	+2.43%
1843	1,932,279	+1.71%
1851	2,243,730	+1.89%
1864	2,441,300	+0.65%
1870	2,681,637	+1.58%
1905	4,533,777	+1.51%
1912	5,472,604	+2.73%
1918	5,855,077	+1.13%
1928	7,851,110	+2.98%
1938	8,701,816	+1.03%
1951	11,548,172	+2.20%
1964	17,484,508	+3.24%
1973	20,785,235	+1.94%
1985	27,837,932	+2.46%
1993	33,109,839	+2.19%
2005	41,468,384	+1.89%
2018	48,258,494	+1.17%
2026	53,399,171	+1.27%
Source: Statoids National Censuses.

=== UN estimates ===
According to the 2022 revision of the World Population Prospects the total population was 51,516,562 in 2021, compared to only 12,342,000 in 1950. The proportion of children below the age of 15 in 2015 was 24.3%, 68.7% was between 15 and 65 years of age, while 7% was 65 years or older.

Year	Total population ( × 1000)	Population percentage in age bracket		
Year	Total population ( × 1000)	0–14	15–64	65+
1950	12 341	42.6%	54.0%	3.4%
1955	14 225	44.8%	52.0%	3.2%
1960	16 480	46.4%	50.4%	3.2%
1965	19 144	46.9%	49.9%	3.2%
1970	22 061	45.9%	50.7%	3.4%
1975	24 757	43.4%	53.0%	3.6%
1980	27 738	40.6%	55.7%	3.7%
1985	31 012	37.9%	58.2%	3.9%
1990	34 272	36.3%	59.6%	4.1%
1995	37 442	34.3%	61.3%	4.4%
2000	40 404	31.5%	63.8%	4.7%
2005	43 286	28.9%	65.9%	5.2%
2010	45 918	26.4%	67.8%	5.9%
2015	48 229	24.3%	68.7%	7.0%
2020	50 883	22.2%	68.8%	9.1%

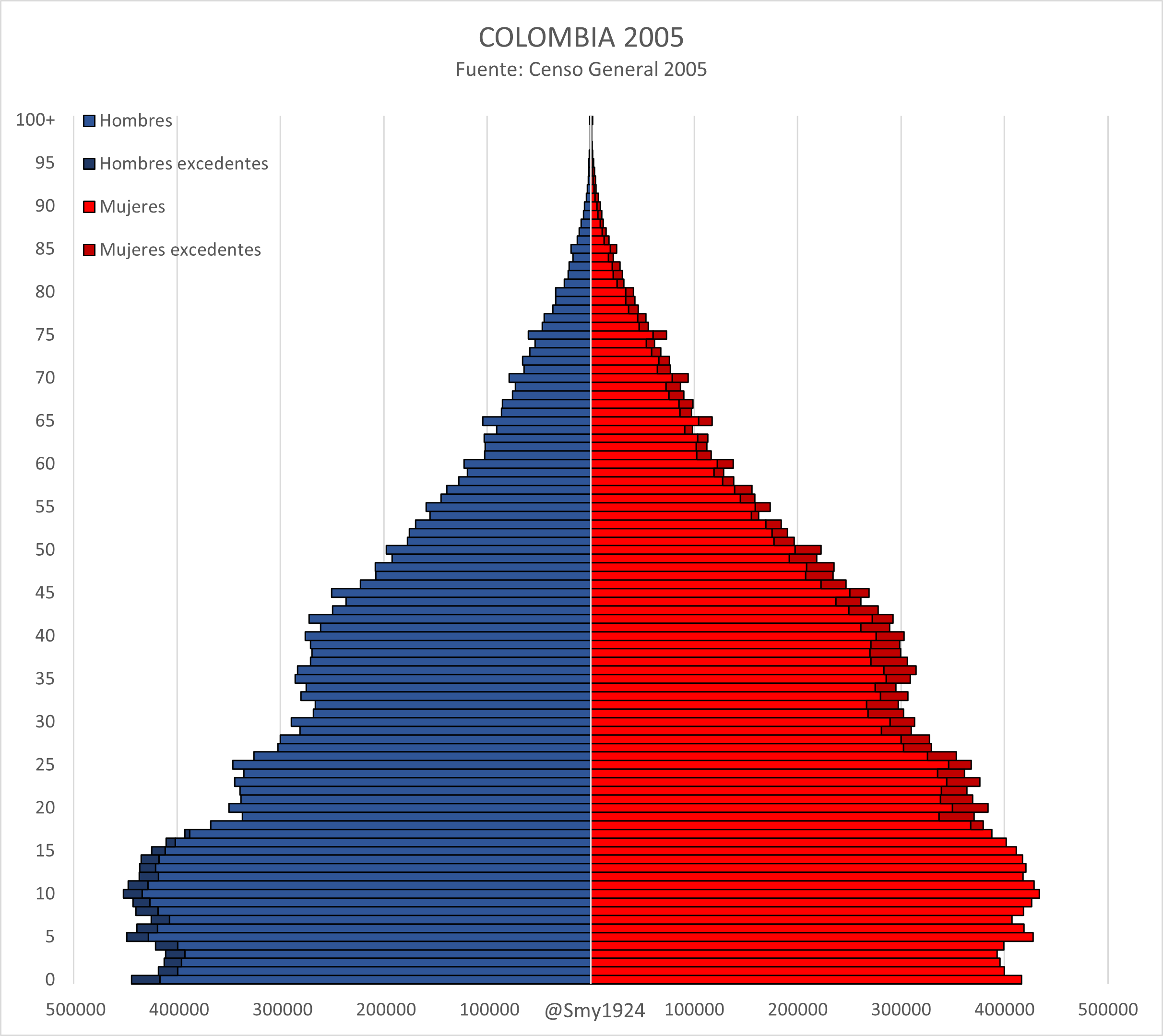
Population pyramid of Colombia, 2005. As can be seen, the surplus of men ends at a very young age of only 18 years old, mainly due to violence.

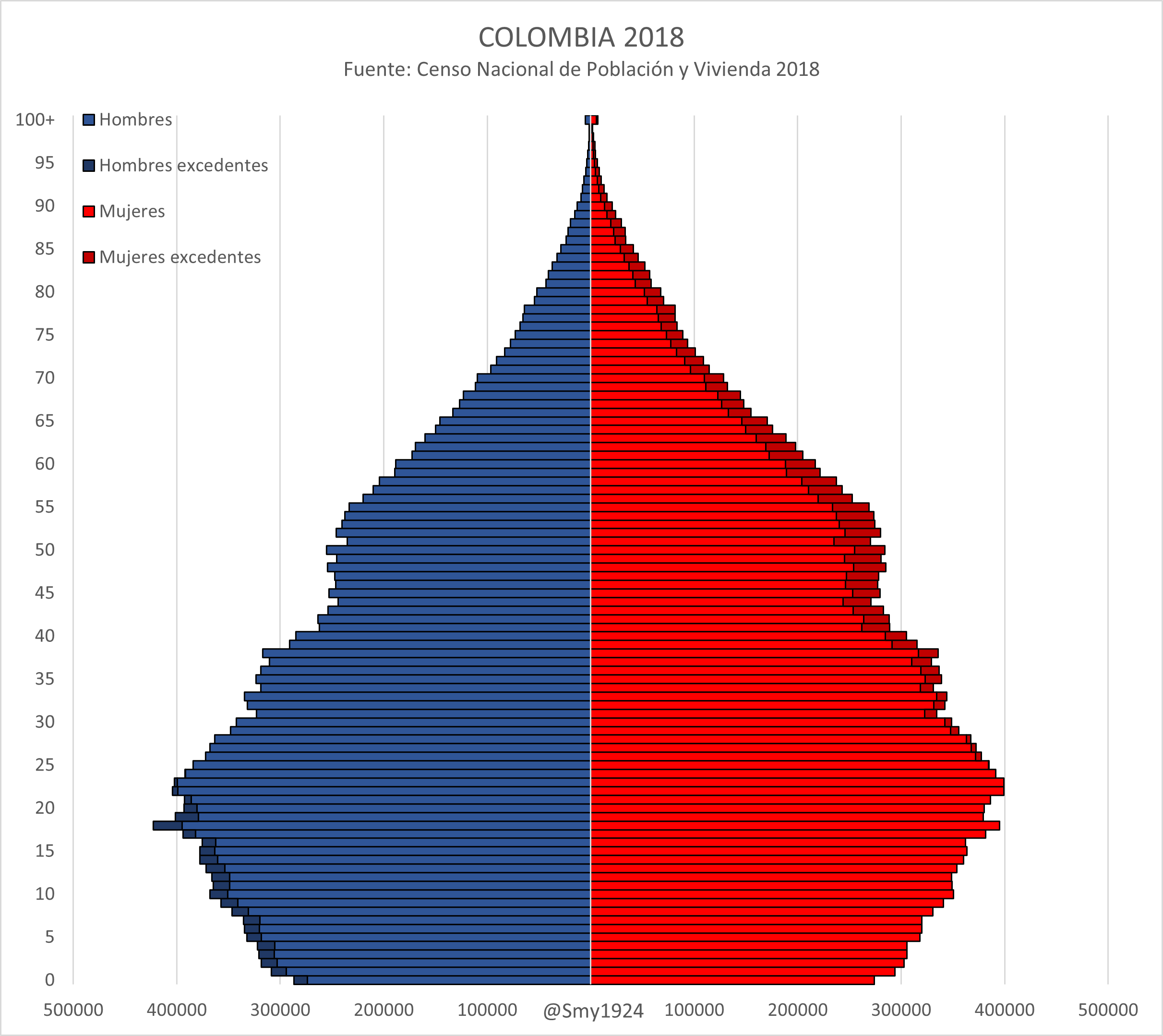
Population pyramid of Colombia, 2018. Men surplus ends at a later age of 25 years old thanks to a reduction in violence.

Population pyramid of Colombia, 2026. Men surplus remains flat compared to 2018, ending at 23 years old; Venezuelan exodus increases the young population, partially offsetting the volume of young Colombians leaving the country.

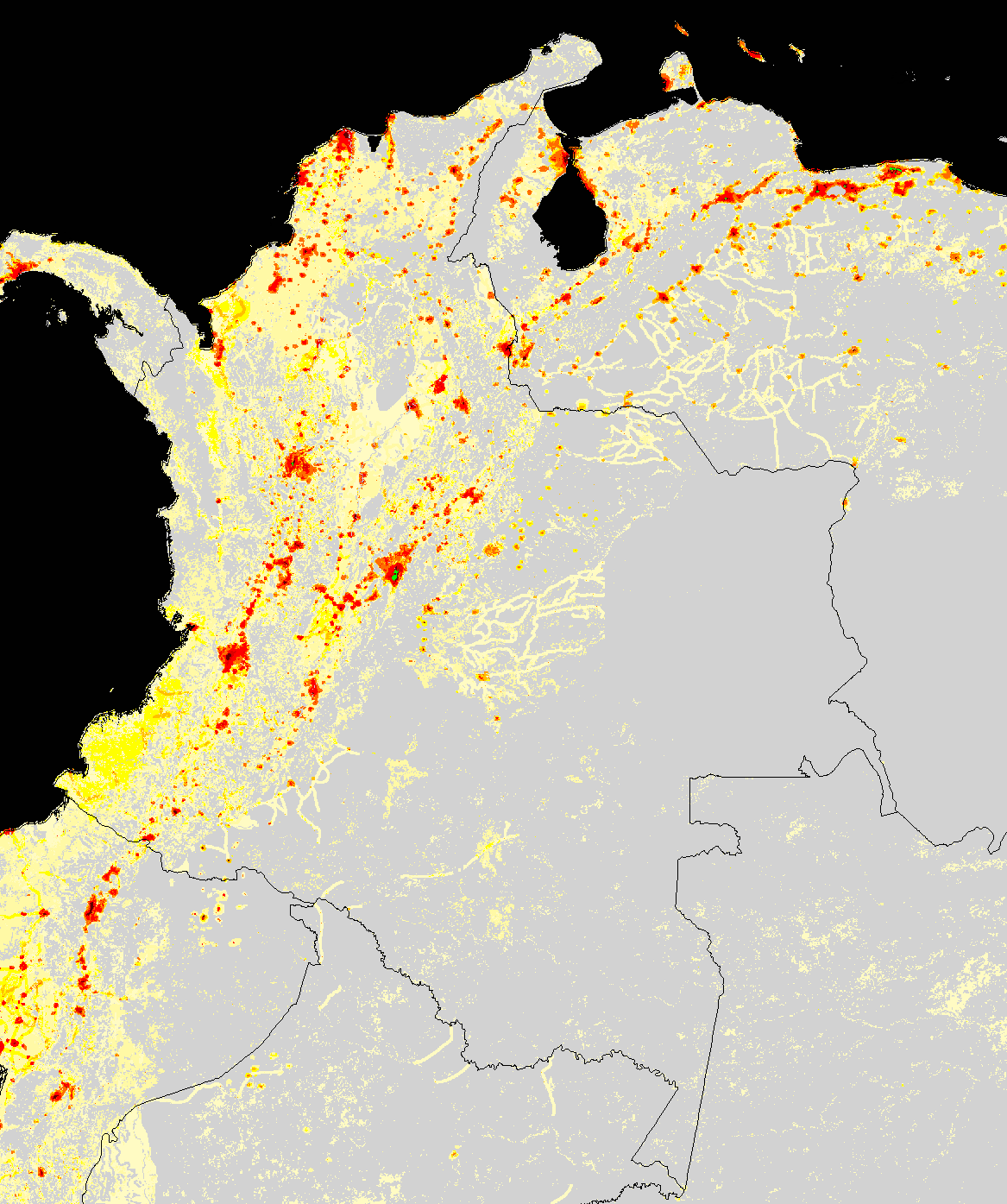
The population density of Colombia. Red showing concentration of population.

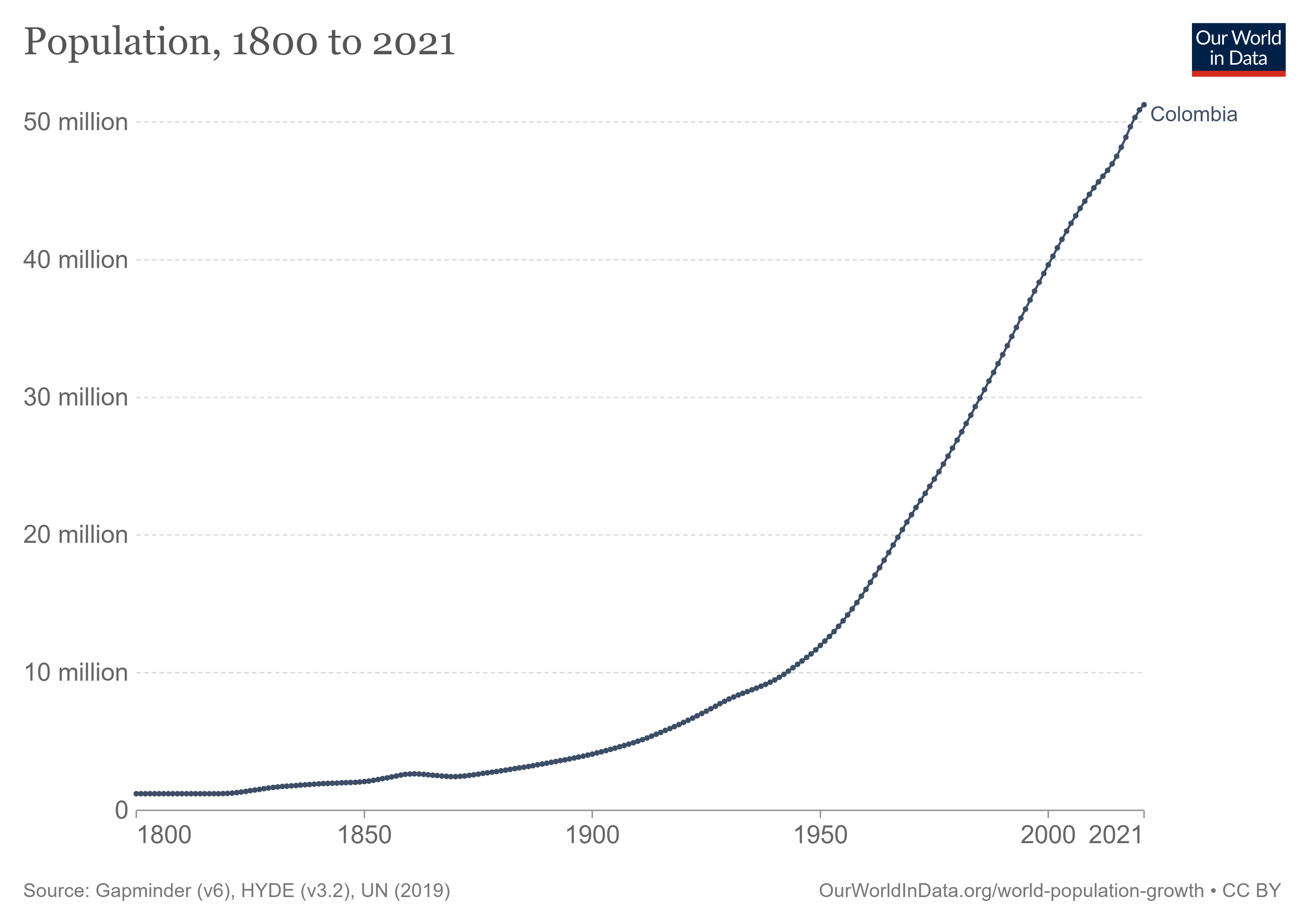
Demographics of Colombia, Data of Our World in Data, year 2022; Number of inhabitants in millions.

== 2018 Census ==
According to the 2018 census, Colombia has 48,258,494 inhabitants within its territory. All the data below is available in the DANE Census results.

View source data.
View source data.

View source data.
View source data.

=== Departmental and regional population pyramids ===
Actually enumerated population according to the 2005 and 2018 censuses; population as of July 2026, based on Base de Datos Única de Afiliados.

La Guajira

654,454

825,364

1,176,806
Córdoba

1,459,794

1,555,596

1,711,484
Sucre

759,026

864,036

965,274
Magdalena

1,134,699

1,263,788

1,434,809
Bolívar

1,831,425

1,909,460

2,391,014
Atlántico

2,107,781

2,342,265

2,852,448
Cesar

874,797

1,098,577

1,310,588
San Andrés, Providencia, Santa Catalina

59,010

48,299

62,115
Caribbean Region

8,880,986

9,907,385

11,904,538
Valle del Cauca

4,029,027

3,789,874

4,703,931
Nariño

1,491,026

1,335,521

1,477,969
Chocó

387,633

457,412

455,134
Cauca

1,176,026

1,243,503

1,359,592
Pacific Region

7,083,712

6,826,310

7,996,626
Vichada

43,982

76,642

93,254
Casanare

275,311

379,892

444,650
Meta

696,662

919,129

1,106,425
Arauca

147,859

239,503

327,227
Orinoquía Region

1,163,814

1,615,166

1,971,556
Boyacá

1,192,983

1,135,698

1,204,151
Caldas

889,402

923,472

933,559
Norte de Santander

1,197,590

1,346,806

1,776,077
Cundinamarca

2,200,790

2,792,877

2,823,241
Huila

993,842

1,009,548

1,215,665
Antioquia

5,562,812

5,974,788

7,121,126
Tolima

1,300,842

1,228,763

1,331,601
Quindío

514,747

509,640

581,991
Bogotá

6,740,859

7,181,469

7,931,918
Risaralda

853,697

839,597

1,100,081
Santander

1,890,976

2,008,841

2,347,437
Andean Region

23,338,540

24,951,499

28,366,847
Andean Region without Bogotá

16,597,681

17,770,030

20,434,929
Putumayo

234,620

283,197

343,221
Vaupés

19,715

37,694

35,569
Guaviare

56,203

73,081

88,559
Amazonas

46,182

66,056

79,034
Caquetá

332,326

359,602

423,856
Guainía

18,761

44,431

55,774
Amazonic Region

707,801

864,057

1,026,013

Rank		Department	Census population		Change, 2005–2018		Percent of the total Colombia population, 2018 (Note: Because of rounding of the individual percentages, the entries in this column may not sum to 100%.)	Area (km^{2})	Population density 2026	2026 population projection	
Current	2005	Department	2018	2005	Percent (Note: This figure for each department compares to a national increase of 12.5%.)	Absolute	Percent of the total Colombia population, 2018	Area (km^{2})	Population density 2026	Rank	2026 population
1	1	Bogotá	7,412,566	6,840,116	8.4%	+572,450	15.36%	1,587	5,006.9	1	7,945,996
2	2	Antioquia	6,407,102	5,696,183	12.5%	+710,919	13.27%	63,612	109.5	2	6,963,990
3	3	Valle del Cauca	4,475,886	4,161,425	7.6%	+314,461	9.27%	22,140	213.0	3	4,714,987
4	4	Cundinamarca	2,919,060	2,280,037	28.0%	+639,023	6.05%	24,210	148.8	4	3,601,277
5	5	Atlántico	2,535,517	2,166,156	17.1%	+369,361	5.25%	3,388	851.8	5	2,885,904
6	6	Santander	2,184,837	1,957,789	11.6%	+227,048	4.53%	30,537	78.9	6	2,410,700
7	7	Bolívar	2,070,110	1,878,993	10.2%	+191,917	4.29%	25,978	86.7	7	2,251,190
8	9	Córdoba	1,784,783	1,467,929	21.6%	+316,854	3.70%	25,020	80.5	8	2,014,312
9	8	Nariño	1,630,592	1,541,956	5.7%	+88,636	3.38%	33,268	51.8	9	1,721,735
10	13	Norte de Santander	1,491,689	1,243,975	19.9%	+247,714	3.09%	21,658	79.3	10	1,717,792
11	11	Cauca	1,464,488	1,268,937	15.4%	+195,551	3.03%	29,308	55.0	11	1,613,329
12	14	Magdalena	1,341,746	1,149,917	16.7%	+191,829	2.78%	23,188	67.2	12	1,558,748
13	10	Tolima	1,330,187	1,365,342	−2.6%	−35,155	2.76%	23,562	59.0	14	1,390,982
14	12	Boyacá	1,217,376	1,255,311	−3.0%	−37,935	2.52%	23,189	55.9	15	1,295,848
15	17	Cesar	1,200,574	903,279	32.9%	+297,295	2.49%	22,905	65.2	13	1,493,824
16	15	Huila	1,100,386	1,011,418	8.8%	+88,968	2.28%	19,890	61.4	16	1,221,847
17	19	Meta	1,039,722	783,168	32.8%	+256,554	2.15%	85,635	13.6	17	1,166,652
18	16	Caldas	998,255	968,740	3.0%	+29,515	2.07%	7,888	134.0	19	1,056,839
19	18	Risaralda	943,401	897,509	5.1%	+45,892	1.95%	4,140	243.2	21	1,006,785
20	20	Sucre	904,863	772,010	17.2%	+132,853	1.88%	10,917	95.9	20	1,047,052
21	21	La Guajira	880,560	681,575	29.2%	+198,985	1.82%	20,848	51.9	18	1,082,618
22	22	Quindío	539,904	534,552	1.0%	+5,352	1.12%	1,845	302.4	23	557,850
23	23	Chocó	534,826	440,123	21.6%	+94,703	1.11%	46,530	12.9	22	599,468
24	26	Casanare	420,504	293,253	43.4%	+127,251	0.87%	44,640	10.7	24	477,966
25	24	Caquetá	401,489	420,337	−4.5%	−18,848	0.83%	88,965	4.9	25	431,867
26	25	Putumayo	348,182	310,132	12.3%	+38,050	0.72%	24,885	15.9	26	395,590
27	27	Arauca	262,174	232,118	12.9%	+30,056	0.54%	23,818	11.8	27	280,022
28	31	Vichada	107,808	55,872	93.0%	+51,936	0.22%	100,242	1.5	28	154,190
29	28	Guaviare	82,767	95,551	−13.4%	−12,874	0.17%	53,460	1.6	30	84,833
30	30	Amazonas	76,589	67,726	13.1%	+8,863	0.16%	109,665	0.8	29	85,896
31	29	San Andrés y Providencia	61,280	70,554	−13.1%	−9,274	0.13%	52	1,221.7	31	63,527
32	33	Guainía	48,114	35,230	36.6%	+12,884	0.10%	72,238	0.8	32	61,065
33	32	Vaupés	40,797	39,279	3.9%	+1,518	0.08%	54,135	0.8	33	44,490
–	–	Colombia	48,258,494	42,888,592	12.5%	+5,369,902	−	1,141,748	46.8	−	53,399,171

=== Structure of the population ===
Structure of the population according to the 2018 census results

Age group	Male	Female	Total	%
Total	23 550 072	24 708 422	48 258 494	100.00
0–4	1 698 699	1 621 485	3 320 184	6.88
5–9	1 862 778	1 780 738	3 643 516	7.55
10–14	2 017 205	1 925 513	3 942 718	8.17
15–19	2 152 328	2 055 812	4 208 140	8.72
20–24	2 166 806	2 137 851	4 304 657	8.92
25–29	2 007 553	2 026 857	4 034 410	8.36
30–34	1 804 867	1 857 952	3 662 819	7.59
35–39	1 703 524	1 809 693	3 513 217	7.28
40–44	1 428 451	1 568 401	2 996 852	6.21
45–49	1 360 889	1 529 794	2 890 683	5.99
50–54	1 327 108	1 510 491	2 837 599	5.88
55–59	1 153 378	1 336 760	2 490 138	5.16
60–64	916 911	1 076 164	1 993 075	4.13
65–69	699 748	820 394	1 520 142	3.15
70–74	501 888	598 405	1 100 293	2.28
75–79	357 112	443 978	801 090	1.66
80+	415 967	582 994	998 961	2.07
Age group	Male	Female	Total	%
0–14	5 578 682	5 327 736	10 906 418	22.60
15–64	16 021 815	16 909 775	32 931 590	68.24
65+	1 974 715	2 445 771	4 420 486	9.16

=== Urbanization ===
Movement from rural to urban areas was very heavy in the middle of the twentieth century, but has since tapered off. The urban population increased from 29% of the total population in 1938, to 52% in 1964 and about 70% by 1990. Currently the figure is about 77%. The list of the most populated municipalities and districts in the country only contains those whose population surpasses 150.000 inhabitants.

Rank	Place name	2026 projections	Birth rate	Death rate	Natural growth
1	Bogotá	7,945,996	7.0	4.8	2.2
2	Medellín	2,526,795	6.8	6.7	0.1
3	Cali	2,269,983	7.3	7.2	0.1
4	Barranquilla	1,275,854	10.5	6.9	3.6
5	Cartagena	1,010,995	12.0	6.3	5.7
6	Soacha	895,878	6.7	3.3	3.4
7	Cúcuta	792,180	9.3	6.3	3.0
8	Soledad	733,597	7.8	3.6	4.2
9	Valledupar	629,217	9.6	4.2	5.4
10	Bucaramanga	618,548	7.7	6.2	1.5
11	Bello	609,168	6.8	5.0	1.8
12	Santa Marta	588,662	10.3	5.3	5.0
13	Villavicencio	588,645	9.4	5.9	3.5
14	Montería	585,029	8.8	5.0	3.8
15	Ibagué	557,317	8.6	7.3	1.3
16	Pereira	487,820	6.6	8.1	−1.5
17	Manizales	475,690	4.4	6.2	−1.8
18	Neiva	408,218	9.1	6.2	2.9
19	Pasto	404,775	6.8	6.1	0.7
20	Palmira	382,703	5.9	7.0	−1.1
21	Popayán	355,347	7.9	6.0	1.9
22	Buenaventura	335,217	7.5	4.5	3.0
23	Sincelejo	331,045	9.6	5.0	4.6
24	Floridablanca	315,194	7.2	5.4	1.8
25	Armenia	307,103	7.3	9.3	−2.0
26	Itagüí	306,397	5.9	5.6	0.3
27	Tumaco	277,065	9.4	3.6	5.8
28	Envigado	268,381	4.4	5.7	−1.3
29	Dosquebradas	246,388	6.1	6.4	−0.3
30	Barrancabermeja	230,559	10.3	6.1	4.2
31	Tuluá	225,868	5.7	6.8	−1.1
32	Maicao	218,184	17.5	3.8	13.7
33	Riohacha	211,811	22.8	4.9	17.9
34	Uribia	208,712	21.2	1.2	20.0
35	Yopal	198,423	11.0	4.7	6.3
36	Jamundí	196,875	8.0	5.8	2.2
37	Piedecuesta	192,888	8.4	4.9	3.5
38	Tunja	191,372	8.5	4.7	3.8
39	Florencia	188,620	10.2	5.3	4.9
40	Mosquera	185,735	7.8	2.8	5.0
41	Chía	177,550	7.6	4.3	3.3
42	Girón	177,523	9.0	4.5	4.5
43	Zipaquirá	169,869	9.3	4.3	5.0
44	Facatativá	168,471	8.8	4.1	4.7
45	Fusagasugá	162,844	6.6	9.0	−2.4
46	Rionegro	156,303	9.4	5.8	3.4
47	Malambo	153,223	7.1	4.1	3.0
48	Magangué	152,489	10.2	5.2	5.0

== Metropolitan areas ==
There are 8 official metropolitan areas configurated according to the Colombian territorial laws; to organize a metropolitan area in Colombia the vinculated municipalities must consult its population to approve such territorial organization. By population, officially recognized metropolitan areas are:

- Metropolitan area of Medellín: also known as metropolitan area of the Aburra Valley, includes the Medellin district and the surrounding municipalities, Bello, Girardota, Envigado, Sabaneta, Barbosa, Copacabana, Itagüí, La Estrella and Caldas. According to the 2026 projections, the population is 4,212,261.
- Metropolitan area of Bucaramanga: includes the municipalities of Bucaramanga, Floridablanca, Girón and Piedecuesta, their combined population in 2026 is 1,304,153.
- Metropolitan area of Barranquilla: formed by the district of Barranquilla and the municipalities of Puerto Colombia, Soledad, Malambo and Galapa, their population in 2026 is 2,298,402, making up 80% of the Atlántico department population.
- Metropolitan area of Cúcuta: includes the municipalities of Cúcuta, Villa del Rosario, Los Patios, El Zulia, San Cayetano and Puerto Santander, right across the international border with Venezuela, the population in 2026 is estimated to be 1,074,787.
- Metropolitan area of Pereira or New Occident: within the Risaralda Department, includes the municipalities of Pereira, Dos Quebradas and La Virginia, which combined make up a population of 765,594 in 2026.
- Metropolitan area of Valledupar: includes Valledupar, one of the fastest growing cities of Colombia, and the municipalities of Agustin Codazzi, La Paz, Manaure Balcón del Cesar and San Diego, their combined population is 767,933.
- Metropolitan area of Manizales: includes the municipalities of Manizales, Villamaria, Neira and Palestina, within the Caldas Department, comprising a population of 587,611 in 2026.
- Metropolitan area of Cali: conformed by the municipalities of Cali and Jamundí, in Valle del Cauca Department, and Puerto Tejada in Cauca Department, with a population of 2,510,567.

In 2022, Bogotá and the surrounding municipalities of the Cundinamarca Department, conformed the metropolitan region of Bogotá-Cundinamarca, a special urban planning region according to the Law 2199 of 2022, each municipality has to consult its population their will to join the metropolitan region, besides Bogotá, immediate municipalites such as Soacha, Mosquera, Funza, Madrid, Facatativá, Cota, Chía, La Calera and Sopó, conform the metropolitan region with a combined population of 9,798,717, the most populated region in Colombia.

There are also other non official urban regions in Colombia, most of them conformed by some capital cities and their surrounding municipalities:

- Urban region of Armenia: within the Quindío department, includes the municipalities of Armenia, Calarcá, Circasia, La Tebaida, Montenegro and Salento, with a population of 492,086 in 2026.
- Urban region of Cartagena de Indias: including the district of Cartagena and the municipalities of Turbaco, Turbana, Arjona and Santa Rosa de Lima, with a population of 1,255,298.
- Urban region of Girardot: between the Cundinamarca and Tolima departments, crossed by the Magdalena river, includes the municipalities of Girardot, Ricaurte and Flandes, combined the region has a population of 149,316 in 2026.
- Urban region of Montería: within the Córdoba department, includes the municipalities of Montería, Cereté, San Carlos, San Pelayo and Ciénaga de Oro, with a combined population of 859,586.
- Urban region of Sincelejo: a fast growing region in northern Colombia within the Sucre department, includes the municipalities of Sincelejo, Corozal, Sampués, Morroa and Los Palmitos, combined the region has a population of 508,624, close to the Caribbean sea and the touristic conurbation of Tolú and Coveñas with a population of 61,148 in 2026. Both urban regions comprise 55% of the department population.
- Urban region of San Nicolás Valley: located west of Medellín, in the department of Antioquia, currently in the phase of consultation,, if authorized by its population, the metropolitan area would include the municipalities of Rionegro, La Ceja, El Carmen de Viboral, Guarne, Retiro, El Santuario, San Vicente Ferrer and La Unión, with a combined population of 485,099 in 2026.

== Vital statistics ==
=== Registered births and deaths ===
Year	Population	Live births	Deaths	Natural increase	Crude rate		Natural change (per 1000)	Crude migration change (per 1000)	TFR	Tempo effect adjusted fertility rate	Life expectancy			Median age of mothers at childbirth	Median age of mothers at first birth
Year	Population	Live births	Deaths	Natural increase	birth	death	Natural change (per 1000)	Crude migration change (per 1000)	TFR	Tempo effect adjusted fertility rate	total	male	female	Median age of mothers at childbirth	Median age of mothers at first birth
1915	5,447,000	154,315	101,277	53,038	28.33	18.59	9.74								
1916	5,579,000	161,199	88,546	72,653	28.89	15.87	13.02								
1917	5,715,000	159,020	85,589	73,431	27.84	14.98	12.86								
1918	5,855,077	216,179	91,639	124,540	36.92	15.65	21.27		5.3862		48.72				
1919	6,086,000	161,638	93,113	68,525	26.94	15.52	11.42								
1920	6,214,000	162,154	83,999	78,155	26.38	13.52	12.86								
1921	6,344,000	170,967	91,509	79,458	27.14	14.52	12.62								
1922	6,478,000	177,645	97,070	80,575	27.51	15.03	12.48								
1923	6,614,000	176,055	90,184	85,871	26.60	13.63	12.97								
1924	6,753,000	172,372	81,239	91,133	25.38	11.96	13.42								
1925	6,894,000	183,090	90,395	92,695	26.30	12.98	13.32								
1926	7,039,000	196,911	102,840	94,071	27.58	14.41	13.17								
1927	7,187,000	201,205	106,039	95,166	27.49	14.49	13.00								
1928	7,851,110	231,168	107,574	123,594	29.44	13.70	15.74								
1929	7,936,181	238,794	102,929	135,865	30.42	13.11	17.31								
1930	8,021,251	233,809	94,125	139,684	28.08	11.31	16.77								
1931	8,106,322	232,434	103,364	129,070	27.11	12.05	15.06								
1932	8,191,392	239,432	104,264	135,168	22.15	9.79	12.36								
1933	8,276,463	244,815	122,840	121,975	25.42	13.90	11.52								
1934	8,361,534	240,050	126,051	113,999	28.71	15.08	13.63								
1935	8,446,604	247,049	126,066	120,983	29.25	14.93	14.32								
1936	8,531,675	246,692	129,976	116,716	28.92	15.24	13.68								
1937	8,616,745	262,762	131,244	131,518	30.49	15.23	15.26								
1938	8,701,816	291,145	150,670	140,475	33.46	17.32	16.14		4.6038						
1939	8,895,570	280,577	156,309	124,268	31.22	17.40	13.82								
1940	9,093,630	292,553	136,453	156,100	31.78	14.82	16.96								
1941	9,296,100	304,012	144,095	159,917	32.38	15.35	17.03								
1942	9,503,080	314,628	151,809	162,819	33.37	16.10	17.27								
1943	9,714,670	312,091	165,749	146,342	32.13	17.07	15.06								
1944	9,930,970	319,724	162,323	157,401	32.19	16.35	15.84								
1945	10,152,090	321,654	159,159	162,495	31.68	15.68	16.00								
1946	10,378,180	340,790	160,460	180,330	32.84	15.46	17.38								
1947	10,609,210	358,975	152,411	206,564	33.84	14.37	19.47								
1948	10,845,420	378,300	154,392	223,908	34.88	14.24	20.64								
1949	11,086,900	388,926	154,662	234,264	35.08	13.95	21.13								
1950	11,333,760	413,721	160,378	253,343	36.50	14.15	22.35								
1951	11,548,172	419,784	165,169	254,615	36.35	14.30	22.05		4.8727		47.60	45.54	49.77	29.11	
1952	11,986,350	436,406	153,738	282,668	36.41	12.83	23.58		4.7750		47.16	45.02	49.44	28.98	
1953	12,369,340	471,019	163,653	307,456	38.08	13.23	24.85								
1954	12,764,568	474,585	150,853	323,732	37.18	11.82	25.36								
1955	13,172,424	511,011	161,863	349,148	38.79	12.29	26.50								
1956	13,593,312	538,485	171,984	366,501	39.61	12.65	26.96		5.6185		53.77	52.22	55.40	29.28	
1957	14,027,648	563,037	173,873	389,164	40.14	12.40	27.74		5.8207		53.95	52.38	55.58	29.68	
1958	14,475,862	585,561	173,681	411,880	40.45	12.00	28.45		5.9516		54.42	52.73	56.17	29.82	
1959	14,938,398	608,670	176,834	431,836	40.75	11.84	28.91		6.0545		54.58	53.12	55.86	29.80	
1960	15,415,713	598,530	183,102	415,428	38.83	11.88	26.95		5.8398		54.35	53.05	55.69	29.88	
1961	15,908,279	626,801	175,612	451,189	39.40	11.04	28.36		5.9938		52.26	49.43	55.26	29.93	
1962	16,416,584	650,561	177,208	473,353	39.63	10.80	28.83		5.9126		52.22	49.46	55.19	29.89	
1963	16,941,130	665,287	176,898	488,389	39.27	10.44	28.83		5.9209		52.22	49.43	55.23	29.92	
1964	17,484,508	674,825	175,349	499,476	38.60	10.03	28.57		5.9598		52.26	49.80	54.91	29.76	
1965	18,043,342	663,816	178,372	485,444	36.74	9.87	26.87								
1966		663,632	174,712	488,920											
1967		669,978	179,676	490,302											
1968		622,884	169,007	453,877											
1969		691,000	153,882	537,118											
1970			201,588												
1971		797,160	206,897	590,263											
1972		745,462	160,412	585,050											
1973	20,785,235	742,500	206,572	535,928	35.7	9.9	25.8								
1974		739,440													
1975		735,673													
1976		731,163													
1977		806,492													
1978															
1979			110,400												
1980			125,573												
1981			139,505												
1982			137,678												
1983			140,292												
1984			137,189												
1985	30,419,892	835,922	153,947	681,975	27.5	5.1	22.4								
1986	30,980,812		146,346			4.7									
1987	31,550,132		151,957			4.8									
1988	32,124,173		153,067			4.8									
1989	32,697,847		154,694			4.7									
1990	33,268,154		154,685			4.6									
1991	33,840,991		163,692			4.8									
1992	34,425,915		167,743			4.9									
1993	35,032,308		168,647			4.8									
1994	35,629,174		168,568			4.7									
1995	36,229,830		169,896			4.7									
1996	36,830,574		173,506			4.7									
1997	37,426,532		170,753			4.6									
1998	37,792,164	720,984	175,363	545,621	18.9	4.6	14.3		2.20		70.1	66.1	74.2	26.26	
1999	38,454,863	746,194	183,553	562,641	19.3	4.7	14.5	2.7	2.26		70.5	66.6	74.6	26.23	
2000	39,140,080	752,834	187,432	565,402	19.2	4.7	14.4	3.1	2.26		71.0	67.1	75.0	26.24	
2001	39,674,811	724,319	191,513	532,806	18.2	4.8	13.4	0.1	2.15		71.4	67.6	75.4	26.25	
2002	40,190,679	700,455	192,262	508,193	17.4	4.7	12.6	0.2	2.06		71.8	68.0	75.7	26.25	
2003	40,693,254	710,702	192,121	518,581	17.4	4.7	12.7	-0.3	2.07		72.2	68.5	76.1	26.22	
2004	41,188,093	723,099	188,933	534,166	17.5	4.5	12.9	-0.9	2.09		72.6	68.9	76.5	26.22	
2005	41,671,878	719,968	189,022	530,946	17.2	4.5	12.7	-1.1	2.06		73.0	69.3	76.8	26.21	
2006	42,170,126	714,450	192,814	521,636	16.9	4.5	12.3	-0.5	2.03		73.3	69.6	77.0	26.15	
2007	42,658,630	709,253	193,936	515,317	16.6	4.5	12.0	-0.5	1.99		73.5	69.9	77.3	26.11	
2008	43,134,017	715,453	196,943	518,510	16.5	4.5	12.0	-1	1.99		73.8	70.2	77.5	26.09	
2009	43,608,629	699,775	196,933	502,842	16.0	4.5	11.5	-0.5	1.93		74.0	70.5	77.7	26.08	
2010	44,086,292	654,627	200,524	454,103	14.8	4.5	10.3	0.5	1.79		74.3	70.8	77.9	26.11	
2011	44,553,416	665,499	195,823	469,676	14.9	4.3	10.5	0	1.80		74.5	71.1	78.1	26.12	
2012	45,001,571	676,835	199,756	477,079	15.0	4.4	10.6	-0.6	1.81		74.7	71.4	78.3	26.02	
2013	45,434,942	658,835	203,071	455,764	14.5	4.4	10.0	-0.5	1.75		75.0	71.7	78.5	26.08	
2014	45,866,010	669,137	210,051	459,086	14.5	4.5	10.0	-0.6	1.77		75.2	71.9	78.7	26.20	
2015	46,313,898	660,999	219,472	441,527	14.2	4.7	9.5	0.2	1.74		75.4	72.2	78.9	26.35	
2016	46,830,116	647,521	223,078	424,443	13.8	4.7	9.0	2	1.69		75.7	72.5	79.1	26.35	
2017	47,419,200	656,704	227,624	429,080	13.8	4.8	9.0	3.4	1.69		75.9	72.7	79.3	26.41	23.39
2018	48,258,494	649,115	236,932	412,183	13.45	4.91	8.54	8.9	1.6465	1.7593	75.4	72.7	78.1	26.48	23.60
2019	49,395,678	642,660	244,355	398,305	13.01	4.95	8.06	15	1.6177	1.6372	75.5	72.9	78.3	26.67	23.60
2020	50,372,424	629,402	300,853	328,549	12.50	5.97	6.53	12.9	1.5391	1.5478	74.4	71.5	77.4	26.73	23.69
2021	51,049,498	616,914	363,089	253,825	12.08	7.11	4.97	8.3	1.4980	1.7481	74.2	71.3	77.4	26.55	23.62
2022	51,682,692	573,625	287,251	286,374	11.10	5.56	5.54	6.7	1.3760	2.0296	74.9	72.0	77.9	26.76	23.89
2023	52,215,503	515,549	268,411	247,138	9.87	5.14	4.73	5.5	1.2305	1.6985	76.3	73.8	78.9	26.93	24.19
2024	52,695,952	453,901	275,778	178,123	8.61	5.23	3.38	5.7	1.0656	1.3864	76.4	73.9	79.0	27.34	24.44
2025	53,110,609	441,537	284,254	157,283	8.31	5.35	2.96	2.6	1.0273		76.6	74.1	79.2	27.47	24.71
2026	53,399,171														

=== Current vital statistics ===
Period	Live births	Deaths	Natural increase
January–July 2025	243,870	163,711	+80,159
January–July 2026	253,175	172,426	+80,749
Difference	▲ +9,305 (+3.8%)	▲ +8,715 (+5.3%)	▲ +590

=== UN estimates ===
The Population Departement of the United Nations prepared the following estimates.

Year	Average population	Live births	Deaths	Natural change	Crude birth rate (per 1000)	Crude death rate (per 1000)	Natural change (per 1000)	Crude migration change (per 1000)	Total fertility rate
1950	11,770	551,064	205,952	345,112	46.7	17.4	29.3		6.41
1951	12,090	565,988	205,240	360,748	46.7	17.0	29.7	-3.2	6.44
1952	12,420	583,360	202,559	380,801	46.9	16.3	30.6	-4	6.49
1953	12,770	600,964	199,936	401,028	47.0	15.6	31.4	-4	6.54
1954	13,130	618,002	198,066	419,936	47.0	15.1	31.9	-4.5	6.58
1955	13,510	635,597	196,985	438,612	47.0	14.5	32.5	-4.4	6.63
1956	13,910	653,149	196,894	456,255	46.9	14.1	32.8	-4	6.66
1957	14,330	671,025	190,300	480,725	46.7	13.3	33.4	-4.1	6.70
1958	14,760	688,958	191,205	497,753	46.6	12.9	33.7	-4.6	6.72
1959	15,210	705,451	187,724	517,727	46.3	12.3	34.0	-4.4	6.74
1960	15,690	722,255	186,589	535,666	46.0	11.9	34.1	-3.5	6.74
1961	16,180	738,333	186,049	552,284	45.6	11.5	34.1	-3.8	6.71
1962	16,690	752,124	185,533	566,591	45.0	11.1	33.9	-3.3	6.71
1963	17,210	763,468	184,487	578,981	44.3	10.7	33.6	-3.4	6.58
1964	17,740	772,893	184,027	588,866	43.5	10.4	33.1	-3.2	6.47
1965	18,280	776,098	183,487	592,611	42.4	10.0	32.4	-2.9	6.33
1966	18,810	776,398	182,973	593,925	41.2	9.7	31.5	-3.3	6.16
1967	19,340	774,512	182,646	591,866	40.0	9.4	30.6	-3.2	5.96
1968	19,870	769,229	181,980	587,249	38.6	9.1	29.5	-2.8	5.74
1969	20,390	762,378	180,816	581,562	37.3	8.9	28.4	-2.9	5.51
1970	20,910	756,293	179,623	576,670	36.1	8.6	27.5	-2.6	5.28
1971	21,410	751,603	177,215	574,388	35.0	8.3	26.7	-3.3	5.06
1972	21,910	747,867	174,530	573,337	34.1	8.0	26.1	-3.3	4.86
1973	22,400	749,007	172,407	576,600	33.4	7.7	25.7	-3.8	4.68
1974	22,900	752,841	169,838	583,003	32.8	7.4	25.4	-3.6	4.53
1975	23,400	761,181	167,106	594,075	32.5	7.1	25.4	-4	4.40
1976	23,910	772,388	165,226	607,162	32.2	6.9	25.3	-4	4.28
1977	24,440	783,971	163,447	620,524	32.0	6.7	25.3	-3.6	4.18
1978	25,000	796,756	162,378	634,378	31.8	6.5	25.3	-2.9	4.07
1979	25,580	811,077	162,475	648,602	31.7	6.3	25.4	-2.7	3.97
1980	26,180	819,818	161,752	658,066	31.3	6.2	25.1	-2.2	3.86
1981	26,790	829,626	162,670	666,956	30.9	6.1	24.8	-2	3.74
1982	27,410	837,994	163,482	674,512	30.5	6.0	24.5	-1.9	3.63
1983	28,040	842,011	165,467	676,544	30.0	5.9	24.1	-1.6	3.53
1984	28,690	849,133	167,428	681,705	29.6	5.8	23.8	-1.1	3.43
1985	29,330	855,217	191,701	663,516	29.1	6.5	22.6	-0.8	3.34
1986	29,960	861,901	173,581	688,320	28.7	5.8	22.9	-1.9	3.27
1987	30,600	868,789	178,536	690,253	28.4	5.8	22.6	-1.7	3.21
1988	31,260	876,126	182,343	693,783	28.0	5.8	22.2	-1.1	3.16
1989	31,920	884,747	186,089	698,658	27.7	5.8	21.9	-1.2	3.12
1990	32,600	892,755	190,271	702,484	27.4	5.8	21.6	-0.7	3.08
1991	33,270	899,439	193,733	705,706	27.0	5.8	21.2	-1.1	3.05
1992	33,940	901,828	196,248	705,580	26.6	5.8	20.8	-1.1	3.01
1993	34,610	903,555	197,750	705,805	26.1	5.7	20.4	-1	2.97
1994	35,300	901,290	199,584	701,706	25.5	5.7	19.8	-0.3	2.92
1995	35,970	897,429	200,808	696,621	24.9	5.6	19.3	-0.7	2.86
1996	36,630	892,339	202,580	689,759	24.4	5.5	18.9	-0.9	2.80
1997	37,290	885,195	204,267	680,928	23.7	5.5	18.2	-0.5	2.74
1998	37,940	879,217	206,553	672,664	23.2	5.4	17.8	-0.7	2.68
1999	38,590	874,245	209,686	664,559	22.6	5.4	17.2	-0.4	2.63
2000	39,220	867,516	209,911	657,605	22.1	5.4	16.7	-0.6	2.57
2001	39,840	859,788	213,177	646,611	21.6	5.4	16.2	-0.6	2.52
2002	40,450	850,588	212,844	637,744	21.0	5.3	15.7	-0.6	2.46
2003	41,060	839,623	212,707	626,916	20.4	5.2	15.2	-0.3	2.40
2004	41,650	827,013	213,860	613,153	19.9	5.1	14.8	-0.6	2.33
2005	42,220	813,688	214,241	599,447	19.3	5.1	14.2	-0.7	2.26
2006	42,770	799,623	214,631	584,992	18.7	5.0	13.7	-0.8	2.20
2007	43,310	787,414	216,353	571,061	18.2	5.0	13.2	-0.7	2.14
2008	43,820	776,110	216,895	559,215	17.7	4.9	12.8	-1.2	2.08
2009	44,310	765,905	217,753	548,152	17.3	4.9	12.4	-1.3	2.03
2010	44,820	758,072	220,750	537,322	16.9	4.9	12.0	-0.6	1.99
2011	45,310	752,881	224,162	528,719	16.6	4.9	11.7	-0.9	1.96
2012	45,780	748,734	228,230	520,504	16.3	5.0	11.3	-1	1.93
2013	46,240	744,381	233,264	511,117	16.1	5.0	11.1	-1.2	1.90
2014	46,680	739,615	238,498	501,117	15.8	5.1	10.7	-1.3	1.88
2015	47,120	734,664	243,633	491,031	15.6	5.2	10.4	-1.1	1.86
2016	47,630	730,565	248,057	482,508	15.4	5.2	10.2	0.5	1.84
2017	48,350	726,008	252,689	473,319	15.1	5.2	9.9	5	1.82
2018	49,280	727,649	260,364	467,285	14.8	5.3	9.5	9.4	1.79
2019	50,190	733,940	270,504	463,436	14.7	5.4	9.3	8.8	1.76
2020	50,930	733,491	335,656	397,835	14.4	6.6	7.8	6.7	1.74
2021	51,520	730,233	397,649	332,584	14.2	7.7	6.5	5	1.72
2022	51,874	723,264	384,947	338,317	13.9	7.4	6.5	6.8	1.69

From January to October 2021, 9.5% of the babies were given birth by Venezuelan mothers. According to the entity during that period, there were 505,114 births and 48,075 were to Venezuelan mothers. In 2017, the birth rate of migrant mothers from Venezuela was 0%, but it has been increasing since 2020, when it was 9.1%.

The births in Colombia have decreased, from 2015 to 2020, a 12.5% lower birth rate. In 2021 there were 12 births for every 1,000 people.

Bogotá and San Andrés are the places with the greatest reduction in births, while the departments of Guainía, Vichada and La Guajira had the highest increases, Guainía had an increase of 108.1%.

=== Fertility ===
Total fertility rate by region

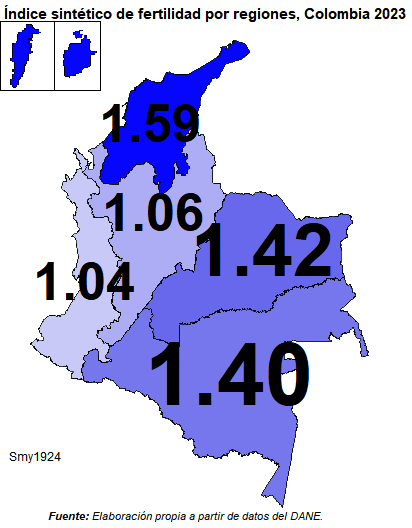
2023

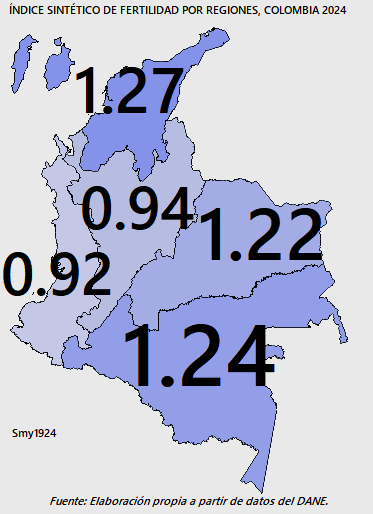
2024

2025
Total fertility rate by department

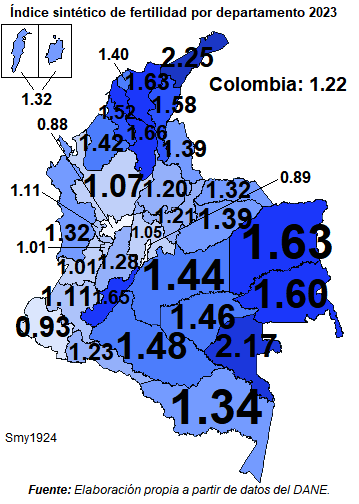
2023

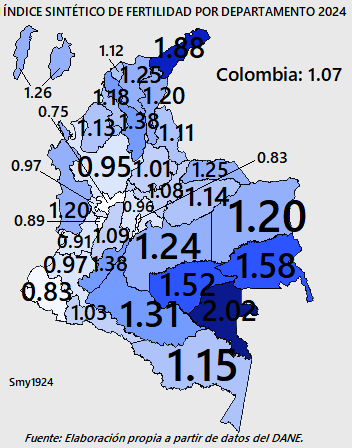
2024

2025
Total fertility rate by metropolitan area 2023

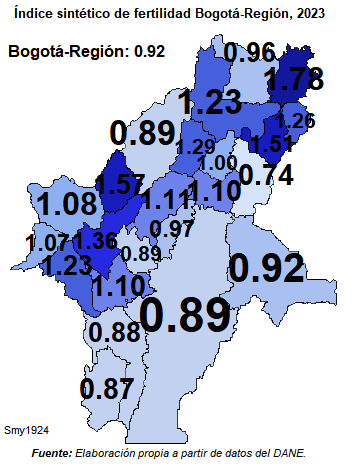
Bogotá

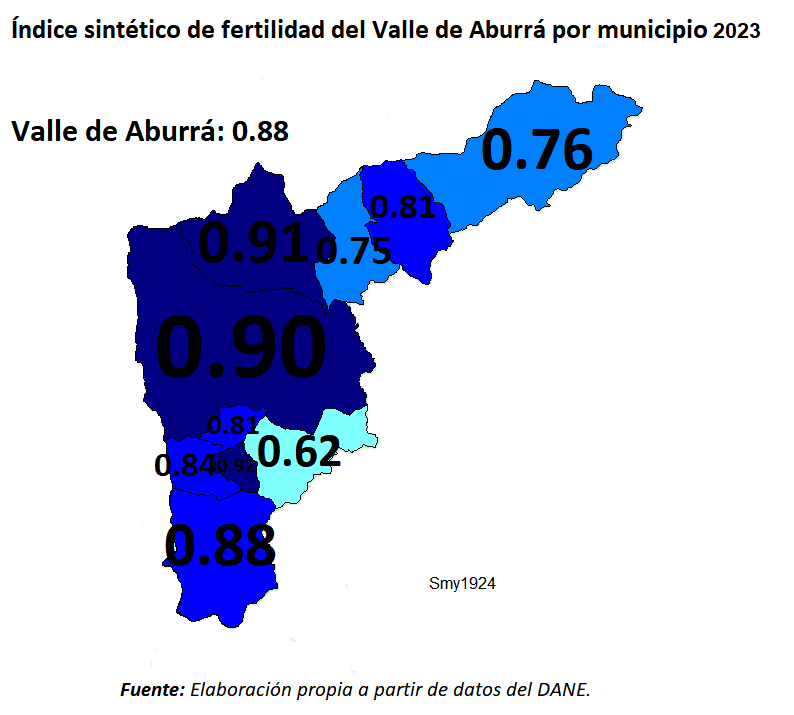
Medellín

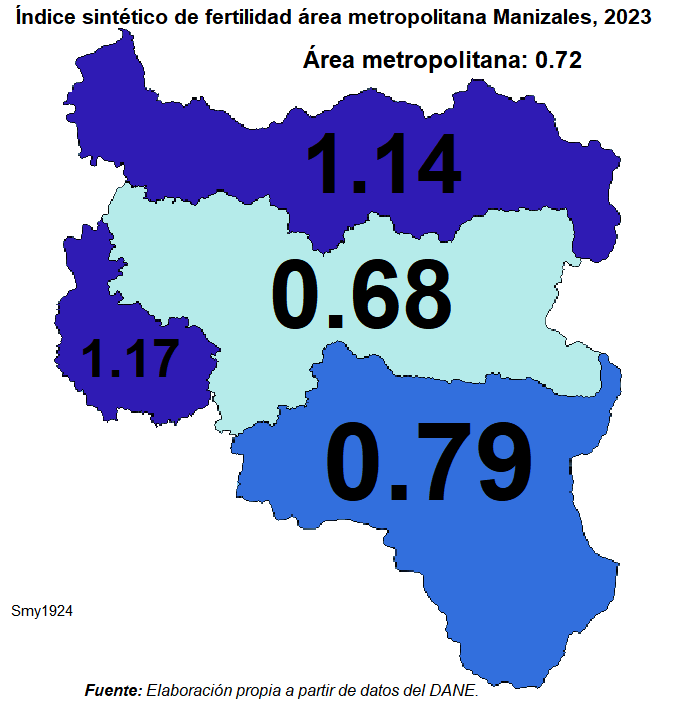
Manizales
Total fertility rate by metropolitan area 2024

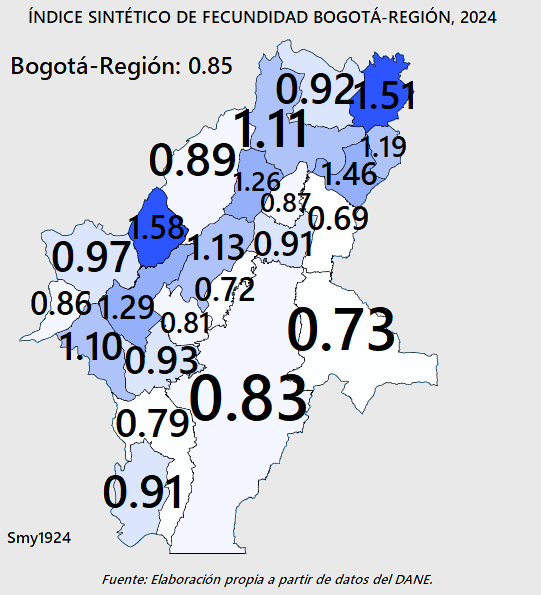
Bogotá

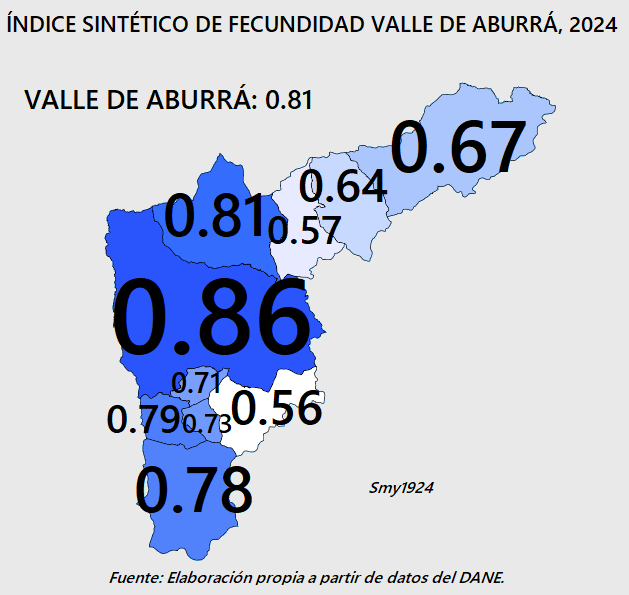
Medellín

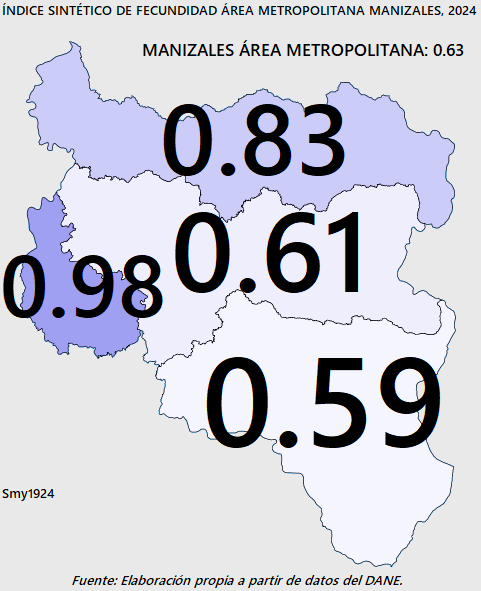
Manizales

==== Current vital statistics by department ====
Department (2025)	Fertility Rate			Crude birth rate	Crude death rate	Rate of natural increase	Registered births	Registered deaths	Natural increase	Life expectancy 2025
Department (2025)	Total (2025)	Rural (2025)	Urban (2025)	Crude birth rate	Crude death rate	Rate of natural increase	Registered births	Registered deaths	Natural increase	Life expectancy 2025
Amazonas	1.092	1.168	1.040	8.8	3.4	5.4	750	291	459	69.8
Antioquia	0.943	1.239	0.872	7.4	5.9	1.5	51,291	40,710	10,581	77.5
Arauca	1.255	1.666	1.067	10.6	4.5	6.1	2,967	1,268	1,699	74.9
Atlántico	1.115	0.640	1.144	9.0	5.3	3.7	25,728	15,046	10,682	76.7
Bogotá	0.839	0.389	0.845	7.0	4.8	2.2	55,782	38,393	17,389	79.5
Bolívar	1.367	1.168	1.436	10.7	5.0	5.7	23,915	11,248	12,667	77.5
Boyacá	1.027	1.163	0.966	7.5	5.9	1.6	9,648	7,624	2,024	80.0
Caldas	0.710	1.061	0.619	5.2	6.7	−1.5	5,462	7,041	−1,579	78.5
Caquetá	1.268	1.465	1.188	10.8	4.8	6.0	4,648	2,049	2,599	75.2
Casanare	1.132	1.287	1.092	9.7	4.1	5.6	4,604	1,942	2,662	76.2
Cauca	0.911	0.931	0.881	7.3	4.6	2.7	11,700	7,296	4,404	79.1
Cesar	1.163	1.135	1.174	9.8	4.1	5.7	14,470	5,989	8,481	77.0
Chocó	1.235	1.087	1.388	10.2	3.4	6.8	6,023	2,008	4,015	77.6
Córdoba	1.069	0.998	1.124	8.3	4.5	3.8	16,614	8,959	7,655	78.9
Cundinamarca	0.940	1.246	0.867	7.5	4.7	2.8	26,541	16,696	9,845	80.0
Guainía	1.590	2.225	1.185	12.4	2.7	9.7	738	163	575	64.7
Guaviare	1.482	1.962	1.240	11.4	5.7	5.7	963	486	477	71.2
Huila	1.331	1.587	1.191	10.3	5.7	4.6	12,507	6,921	5,586	76.8
La Guajira	1.893	2.265	1.571	16.4	3.1	13.3	17,489	3,334	14,155	69.4
Magdalena	1.204	1.001	1.289	9.8	4.5	5.3	15,167	6,906	8,261	77.1
Meta	1.211	1.225	1.212	9.8	5.2	4.6	11,295	6,049	5,246	75.7
Nariño	0.831	0.696	1.000	6.6	4.8	1.8	11,311	8,247	3,064	78.3
Norte de Santander	1.062	1.081	1.061	8.7	5.3	3.4	14,854	9,137	5,717	76.0
Putumayo	0.981	1.024	0.954	8.5	3.6	4.9	3,338	1,416	1,922	77.9
Quindío	0.917	0.783	0.938	6.8	8.5	−1.7	3,776	4,738	−962	76.9
Risaralda	0.912	1.190	0.848	6.9	7.3	−0.4	6,957	7,395	−438	77.3
San Andrés	1.181	0.963	1.265	8.6	5.6	3.0	546	355	191	72.2
Santander	1.004	1.056	0.994	7.7	5.4	2.3	18,366	12,988	5,378	78.9
Sucre	1.118	1.009	1.179	8.7	4.5	4.2	9,028	4,704	4,324	77.7
Tolima	1.115	1.156	1.101	8.1	6.9	1.2	11,215	9,602	1,613	77.1
Valle del Cauca	0.903	0.844	0.916	6.9	6.8	0.1	32,308	31,883	425	77.0
Vaupés	2.016	2.303	1.473	12.2	3.4	8.8	540	148	392	62.6
Vichada	1.150	1.005	1.737	9.1	1.5	7.6	1,347	218	1,129	71.6
No information								2,083		
Colombia	1.027	1.137	0.997	8.3	5.4	2.9	441,537	284,254	157,283	77.7

==== Before 1950 ====
Years	1920	1921	1922	1923	1924	1925	1926	1927	1928	1929
Total Fertility Rate in Colombia	6.39	6.41	6.42	6.43	6.44	6.45	6.46	6.47	6.42	6.37

Years	1930	1931	1932	1933	1934	1935	1936	1937	1938	1939
Total Fertility Rate in Colombia	6.33	6.28	6.24	6.22	6.19	6.17	6.15	6.13	6.13	6.12

Years	1940	1941	1942	1943	1944	1945	1946	1947	1948	1949
Total Fertility Rate in Colombia	6.12	6.11	6.11	6.13	6.16	6.19	6.22	6.25	6.42	6.60

=== Life expectancy ===
Life expectancy in Colombia since 1900

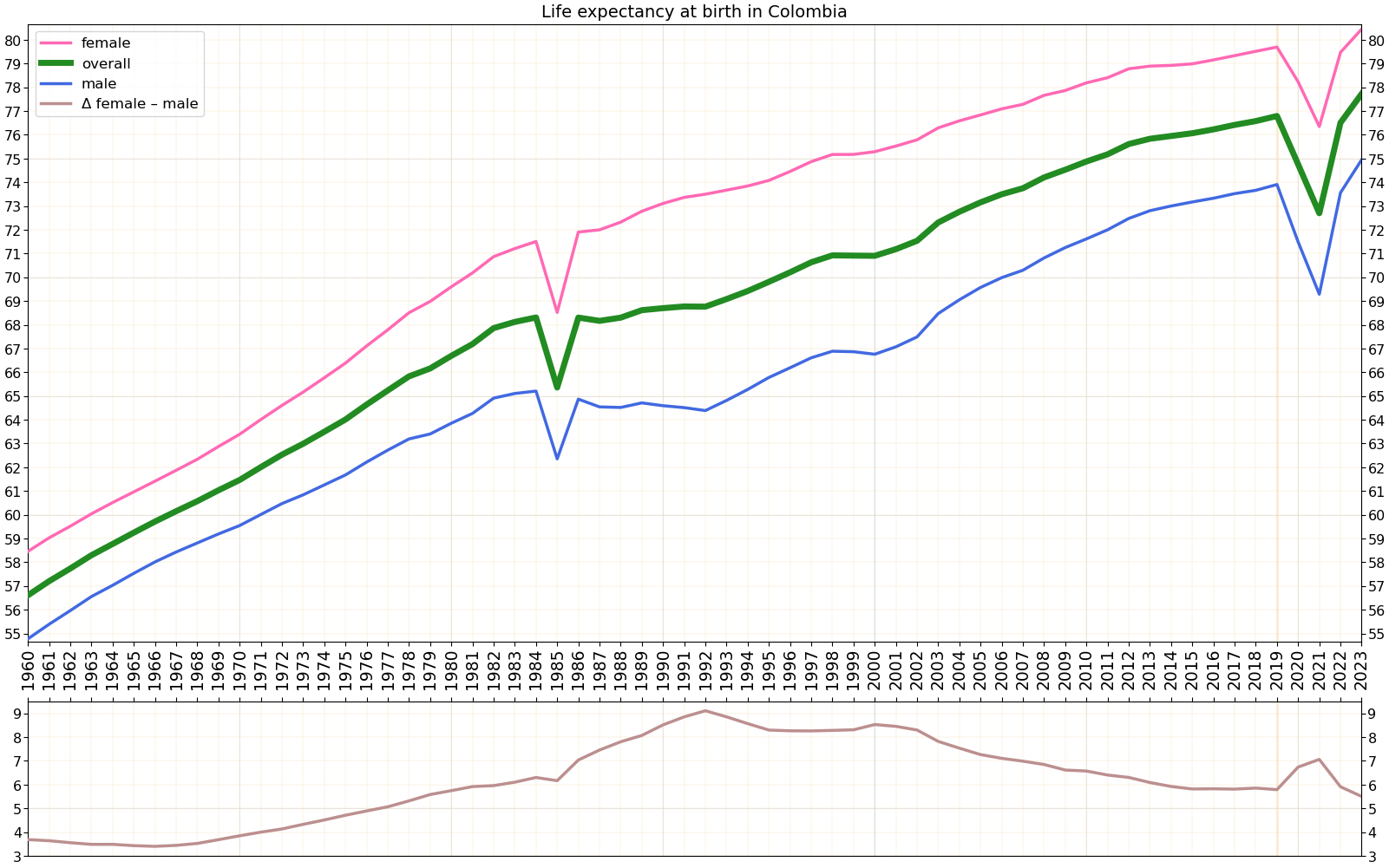
Life expectancy in Colombia since 1960 by gender

== Ethnicity ==
Ethnic groups in Colombia
Ethnic group	percent
Unclassified (Mostly White and Mestizo)	87.58%
Black (includes Mulatto, Raizal, and Palenquero)	6.76%
Amerindian	4.31%
Romani	0.006%

Colombia is ethnically diverse, its original people descending from the original native inhabitants, Spanish and European colonists, Africans originally brought to the country as slaves, and 20th-century immigrants from Europe and the Middle East, all contributing to a diverse cultural heritage. The demographic distribution reflects a pattern that is influenced by colonial history. Whites tend to live mainly in urban centers, like Bogotá, Medellín or Cali, and the burgeoning highland cities. The populations of the major cities also include mestizos. Mestizos include artisans and small tradesmen that have played a major part in the urban expansion of recent decades.

The 2005 census (outdated) reported that the "non-ethnic population", consisting of whites and mestizos (those of majority Indigenous American ancestry), constituted 86% of the national population. 10.6% is of black ancestry. Indigenous Colombians comprise 3.4% of the population. Less than 0.01% of the population is Roma. An extraofficial estimate considers that the 49% of the Colombian population is Mestizo or of mixed European and Amerindian ancestry, and that approximately 19–37% is White, mainly of Spanish lineage, but there is also a large population of Middle East descent; among the upper class there is a considerable input of Italian ancestry.

Many of the Indigenous peoples experienced a reduction in population during the Spanish rule and many others were absorbed into the mestizo population, but the remainder currently represents over eighty distinct cultures. Reserves (resguardos) established for indigenous peoples occupy 30,571,640 hectares (305,716.4 km^{2}) (27% of the country's total) and are inhabited by more than 800,000 people. Some of the largest indigenous groups are the Wayuu, the Paez, the Pastos, the Emberá and the Zenú. The departments of La Guajira, Cauca, Nariño, Córdoba and Sucre have the largest indigenous populations.

The Organización Nacional Indígena de Colombia (ONIC), founded at the first National Indigenous Congress in 1982, is an organization representing the indigenous peoples of Colombia. In 1991, Colombia signed and ratified the current international law concerning indigenous peoples, Indigenous and Tribal Peoples Convention, 1989.

Black Africans were brought as slaves, mostly to the coastal lowlands, beginning early in the 16th century and continuing into the 19th century. Large Afro-Colombian communities are found today on the Caribbean and Pacific coasts. The population of the department of Chocó, running along the northern portion of Colombia's Pacific coast, is over 70% black. Britons and Jamaicans migrated mainly to the islands of San Andres and Providencia Islands. A number of other Europeans and North Americans migrated to the country in the late 19th and early 20th centuries, including people from the former USSR during and after the Second World War.

Many immigrant communities have settled on the Caribbean coast, in particular recent immigrants from the Middle East. Barranquilla (the largest city of the Colombian Caribbean) and other Caribbean cities have the largest populations of Phoenician (Lebanese), Palestinian and other Middle Easterners. There are also important communities of Romanis and Jews. There is a major migration trend of Venezuelans, due to the political crisis and economic collapse in Venezuela.

Ethnic groups in Colombia (Estimation)
Ethnic group	Population
Mestizo	50.3%
White	26.4%
Indigenous	9.5%
Black	9.0%
Mulatto	4.4%
Asian	0.4%

Population pyramids by racial-ethnic group, 2005 and 2018 censuses.

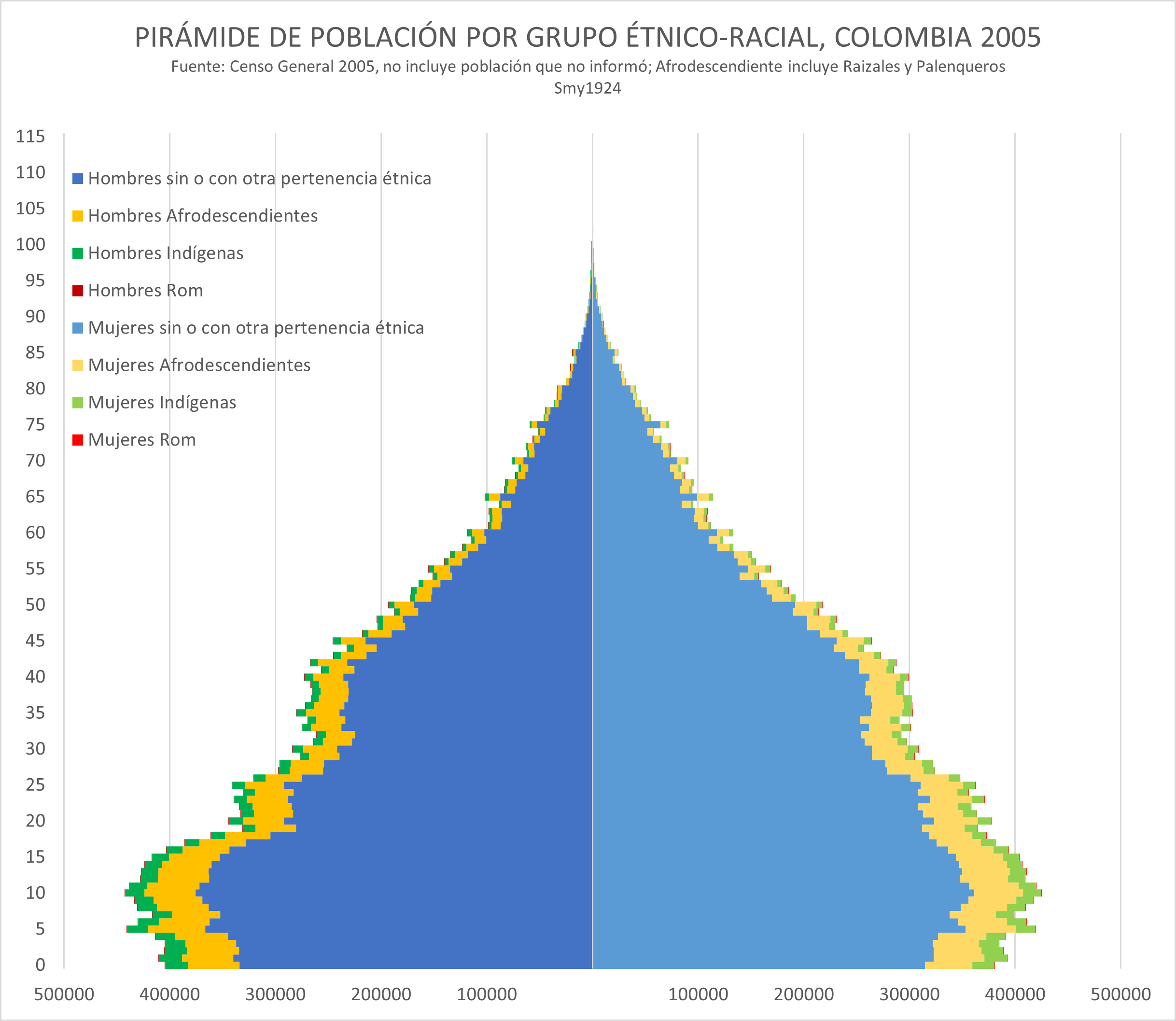
Population pyramid of Colombia by ethnic-racial group, 2005.
Male/Female with no ethnic-racial group or another ethnic-racial group.
Black
Indigenous
Rromani

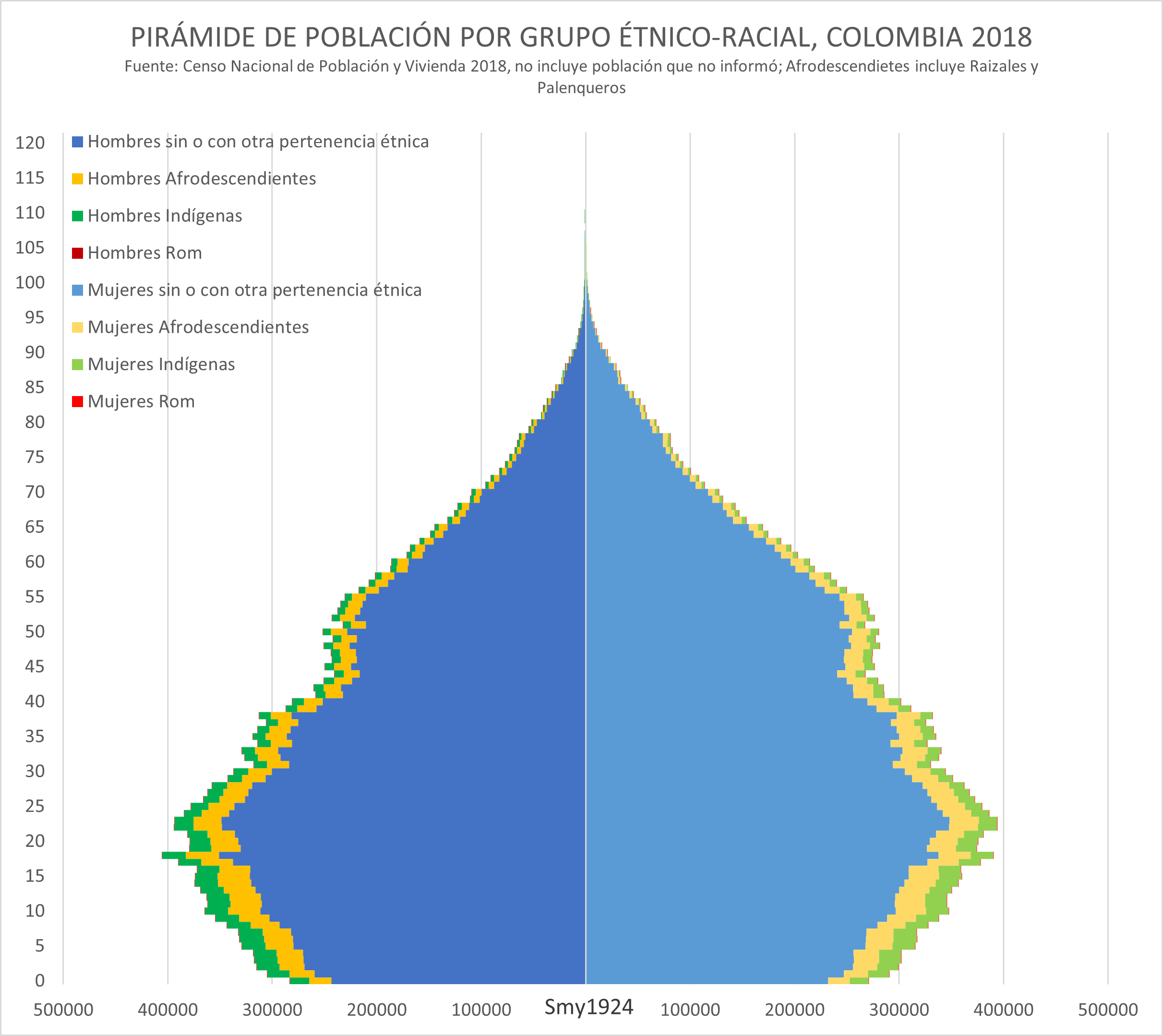
Population pyramid of Colombia by ethnic-racial group, 2018.
Male/Female with no ethnic-racial group or another ethnic-racial group.
Black
Indigenous
Rromani
Ethnic-racial composition by simple age and sex

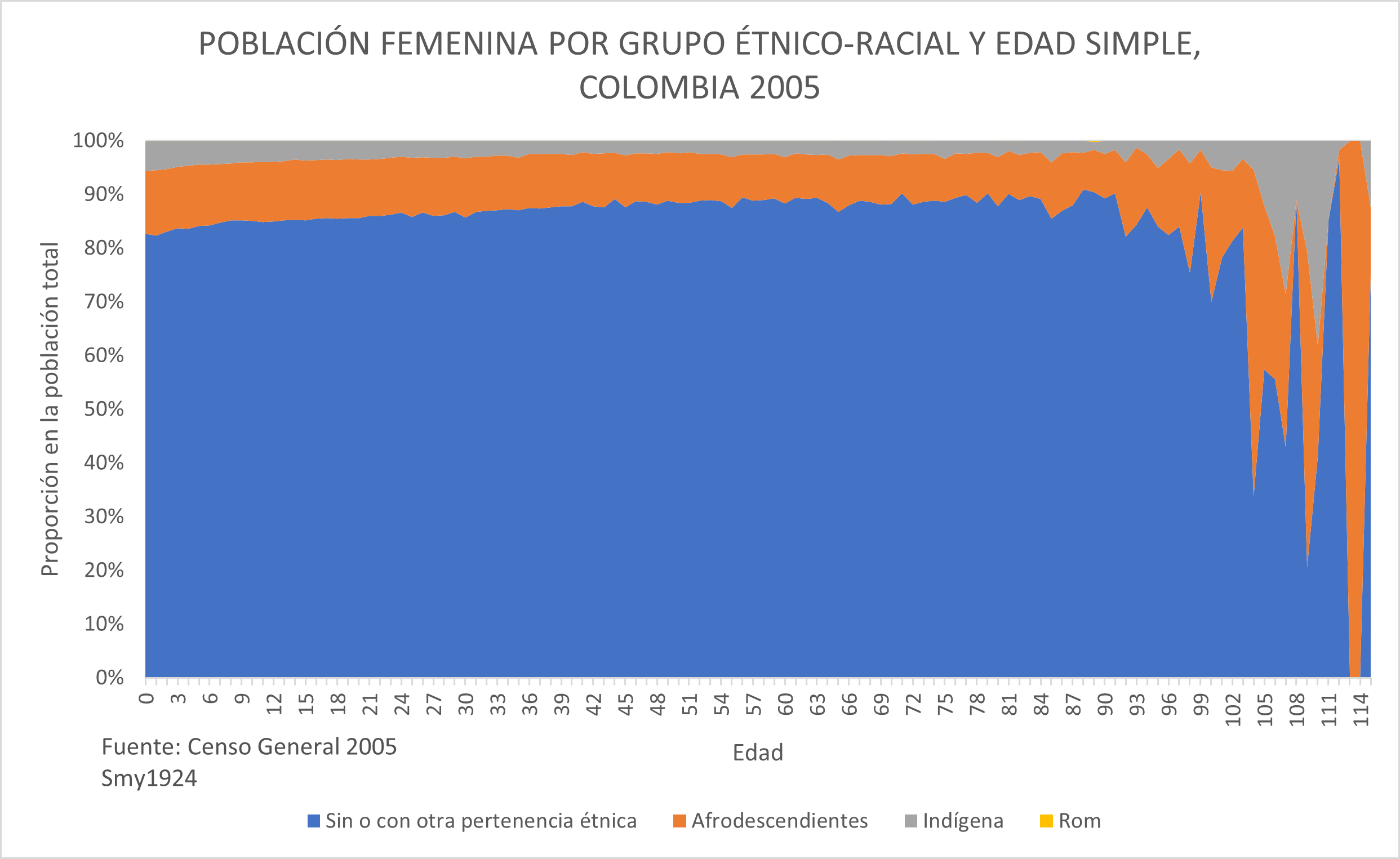
Female ethnic-racial composition by simple age, 2005.

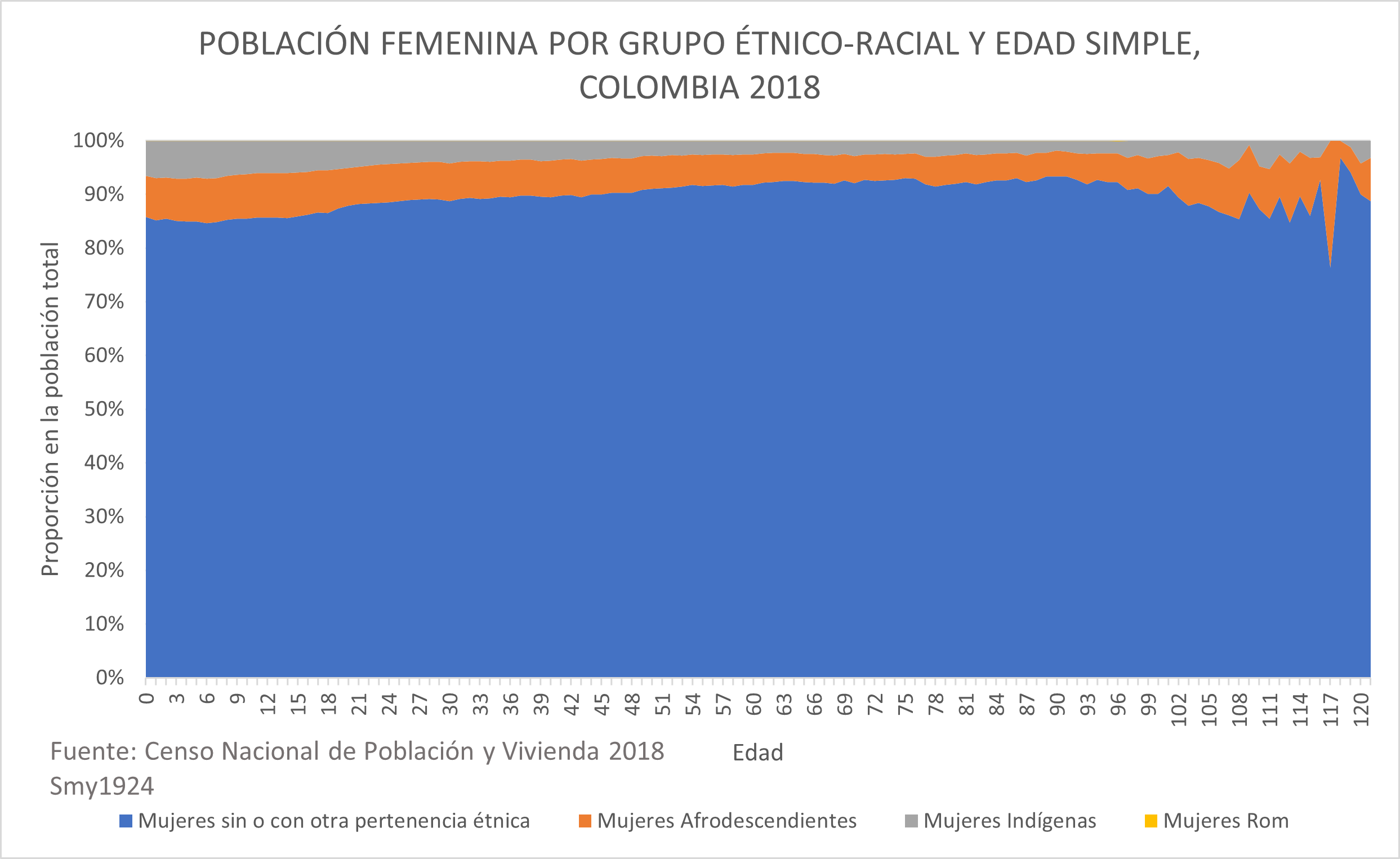
Female ethnic-racial composition by simple age, 2018.

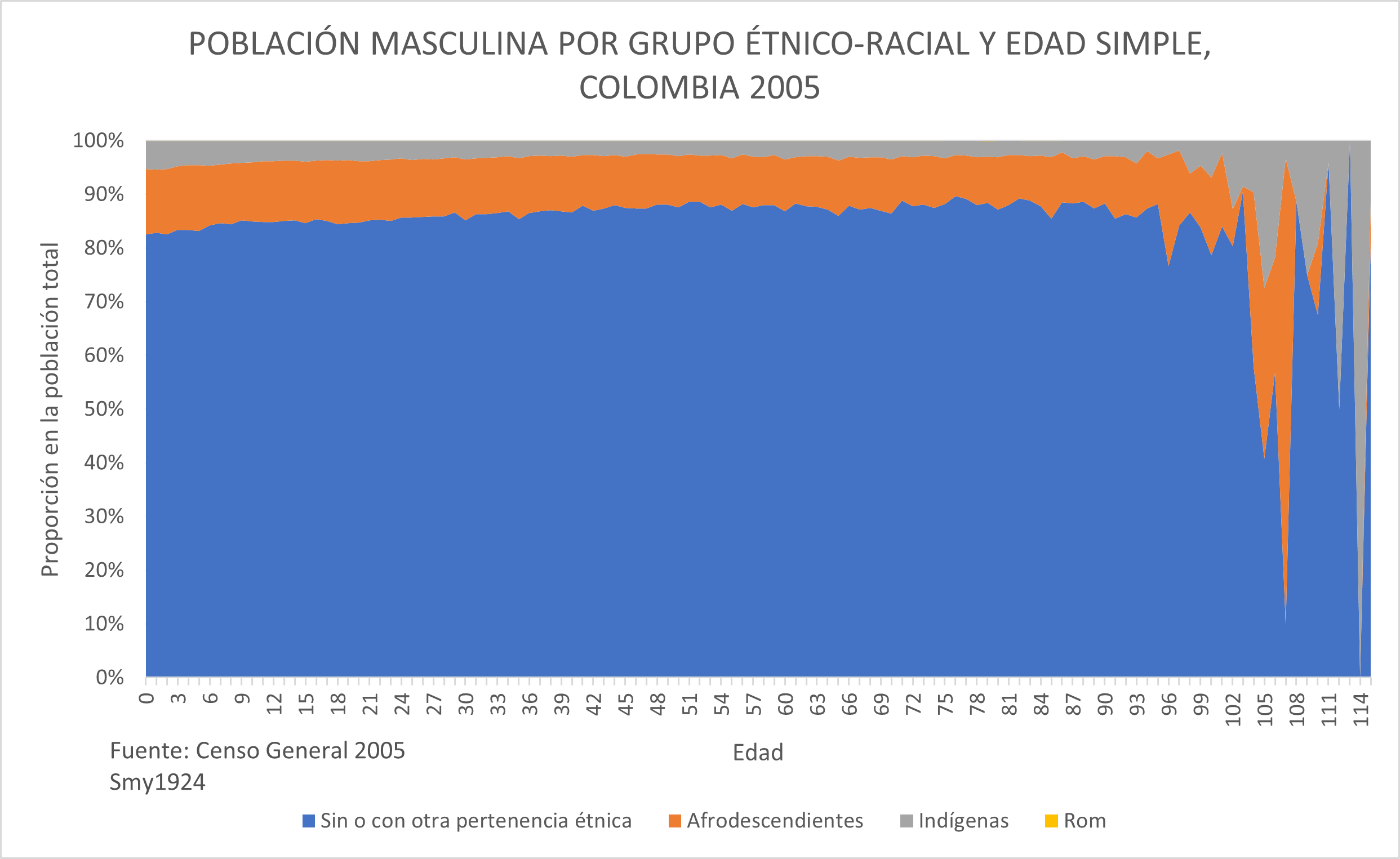
Male ethnic-racial composition by simple age, 2005.

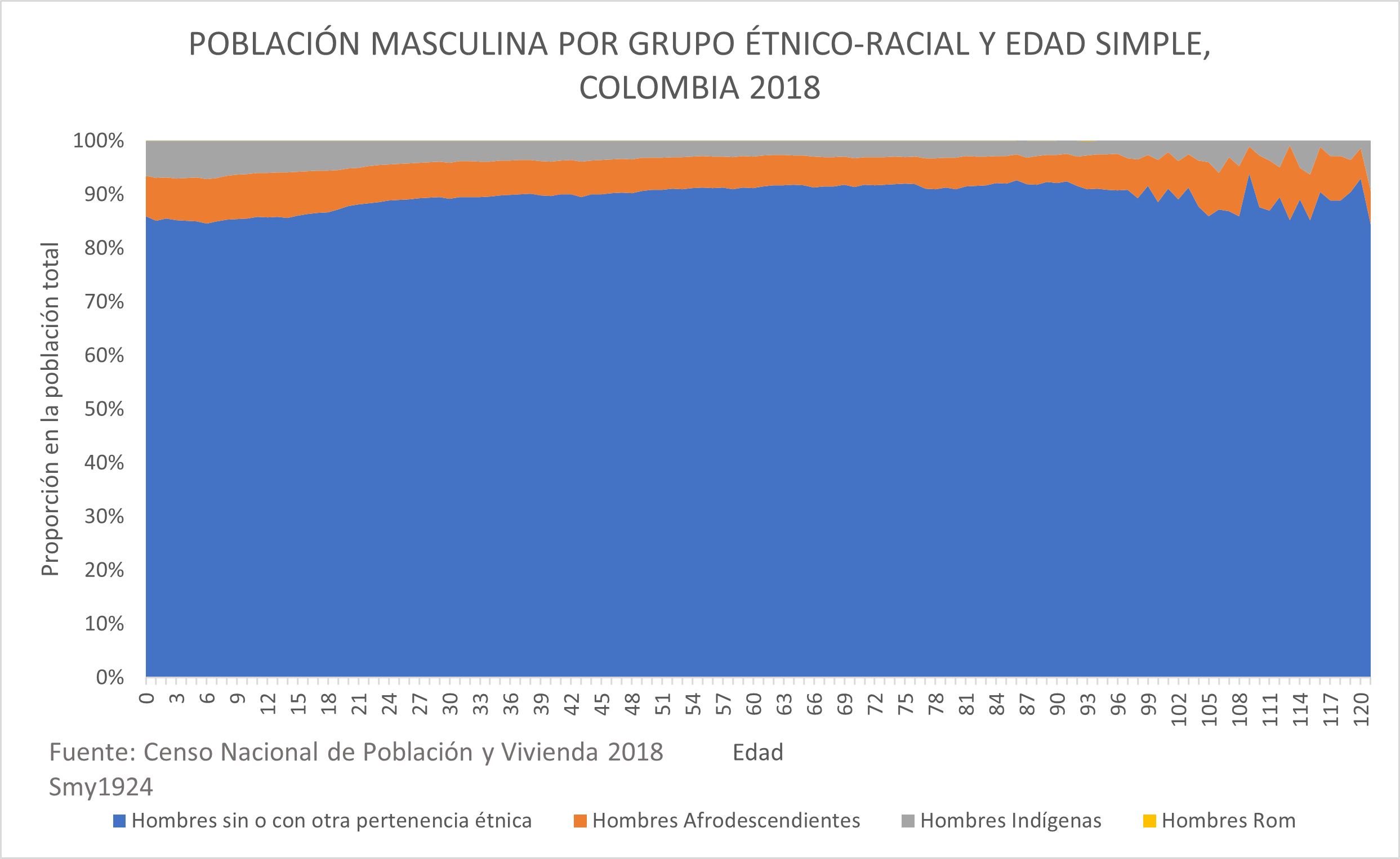
Male ethnic-racial composition by simple age, 2018.
Population pyramids by ethnic-racial group 2005 and 2018

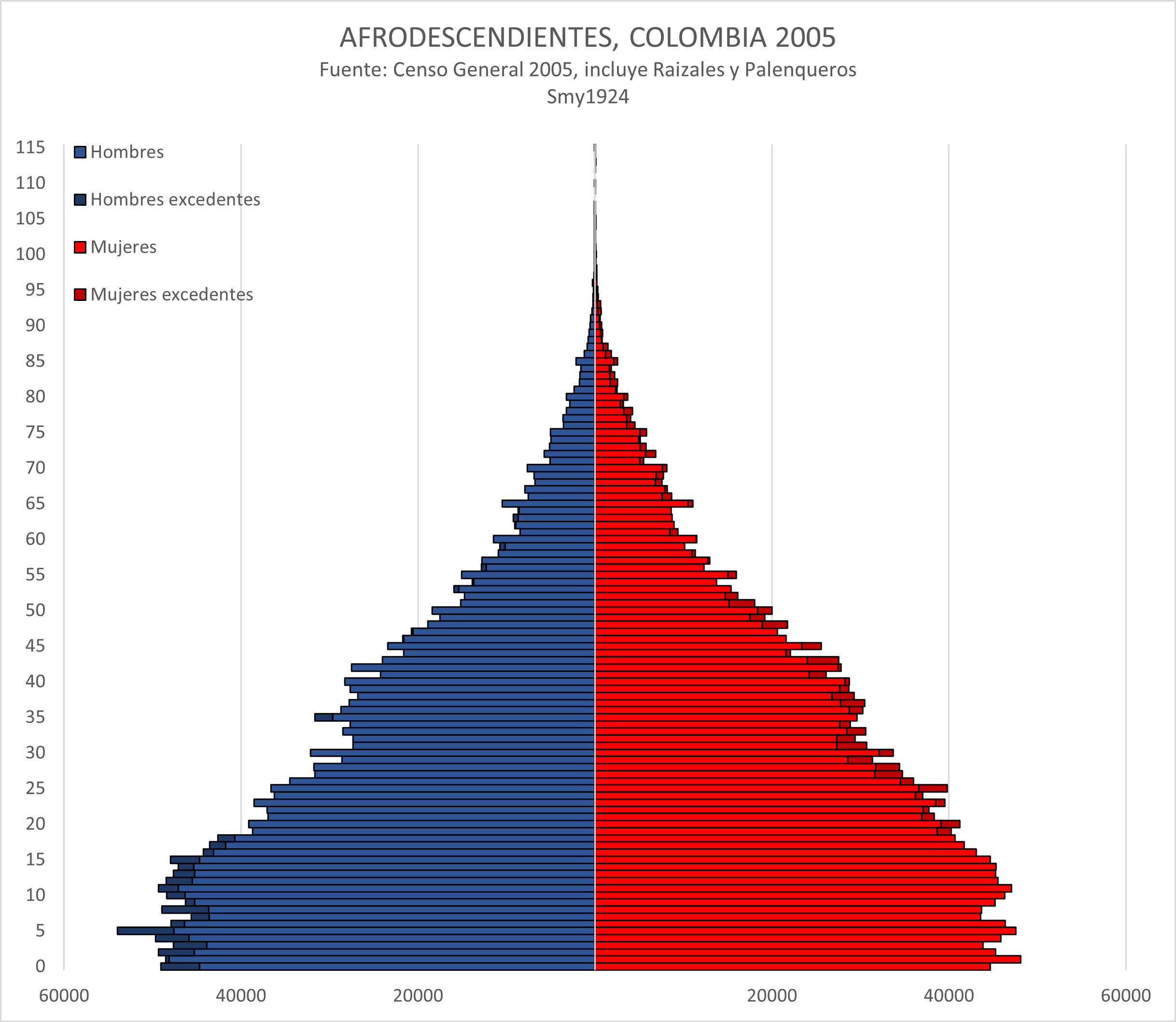
Afrodescendants 2005.

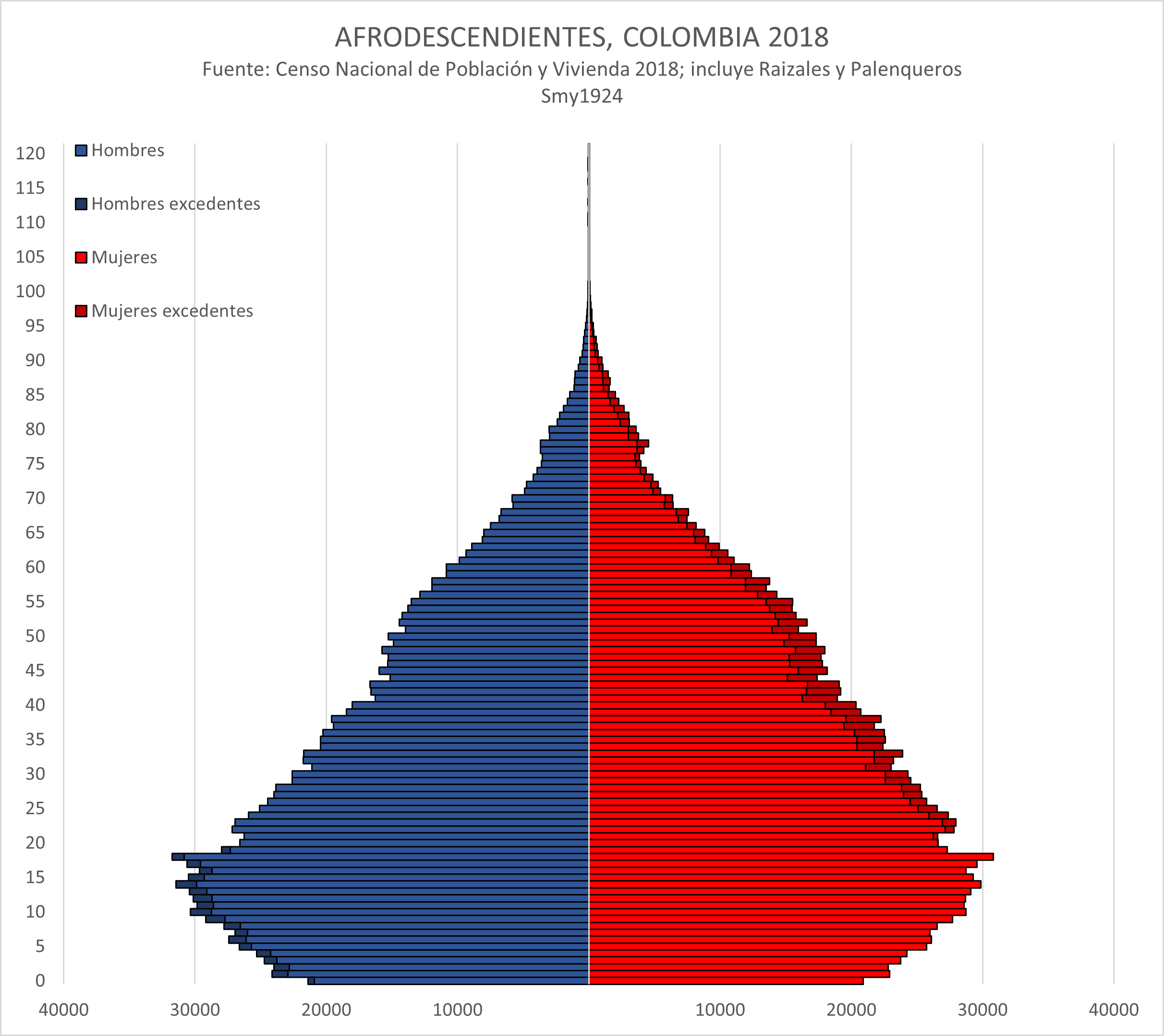
Afrodescendants 2018. Black population reduced 30.8% compared to 2005 due to operational and methodological failures in the 2018 census.

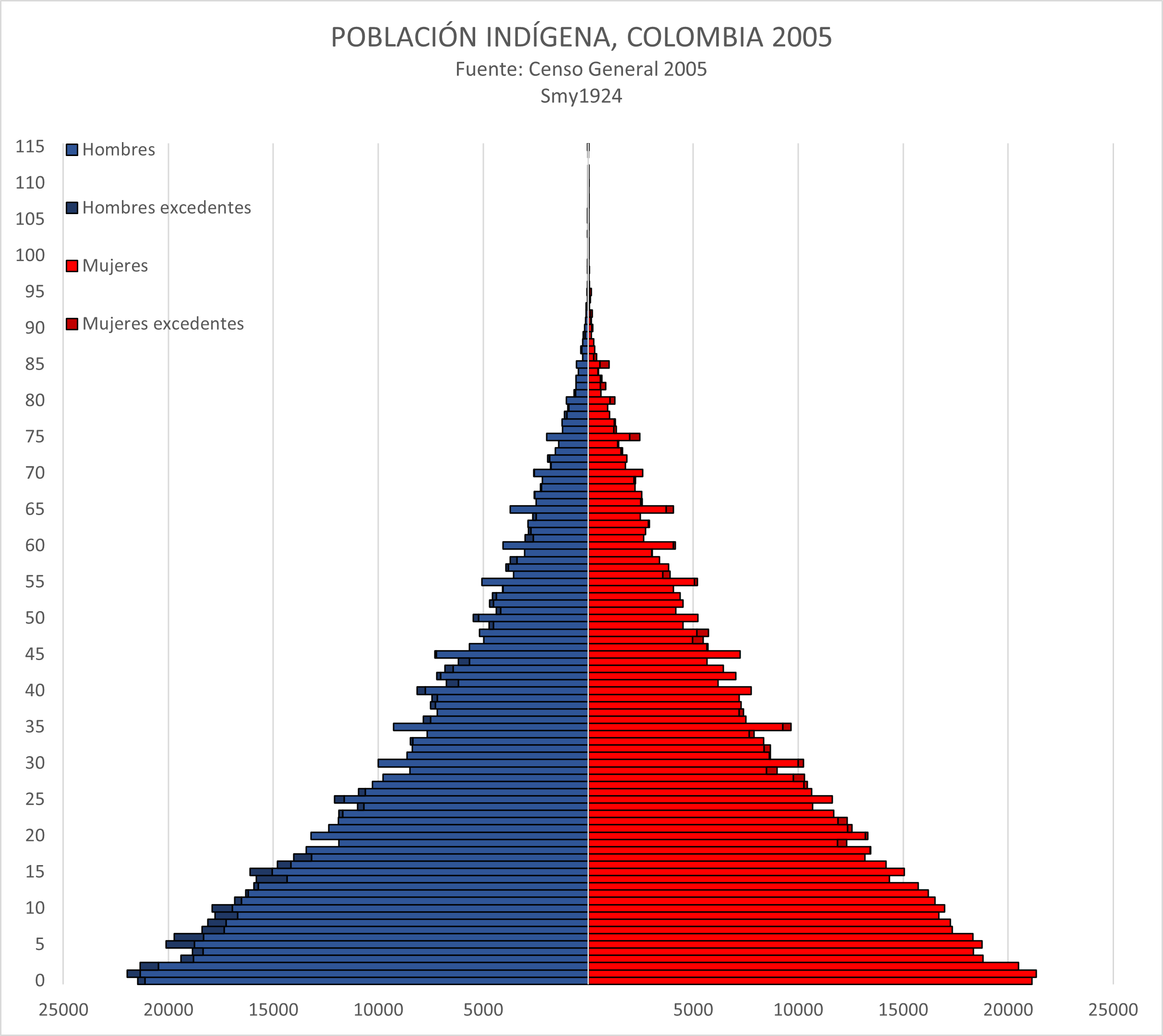
Indigenous 2005.

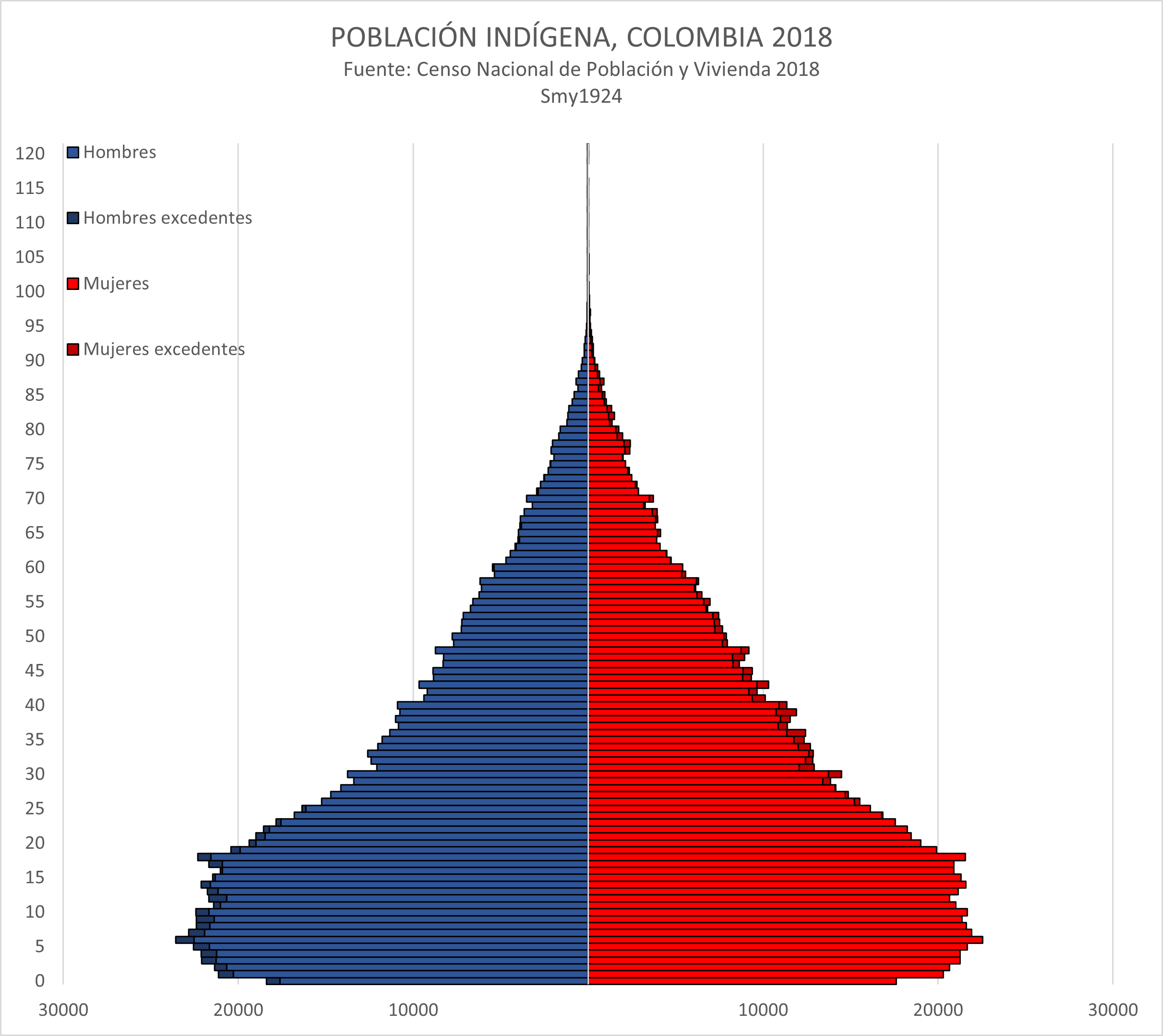
Indigenous 2018.

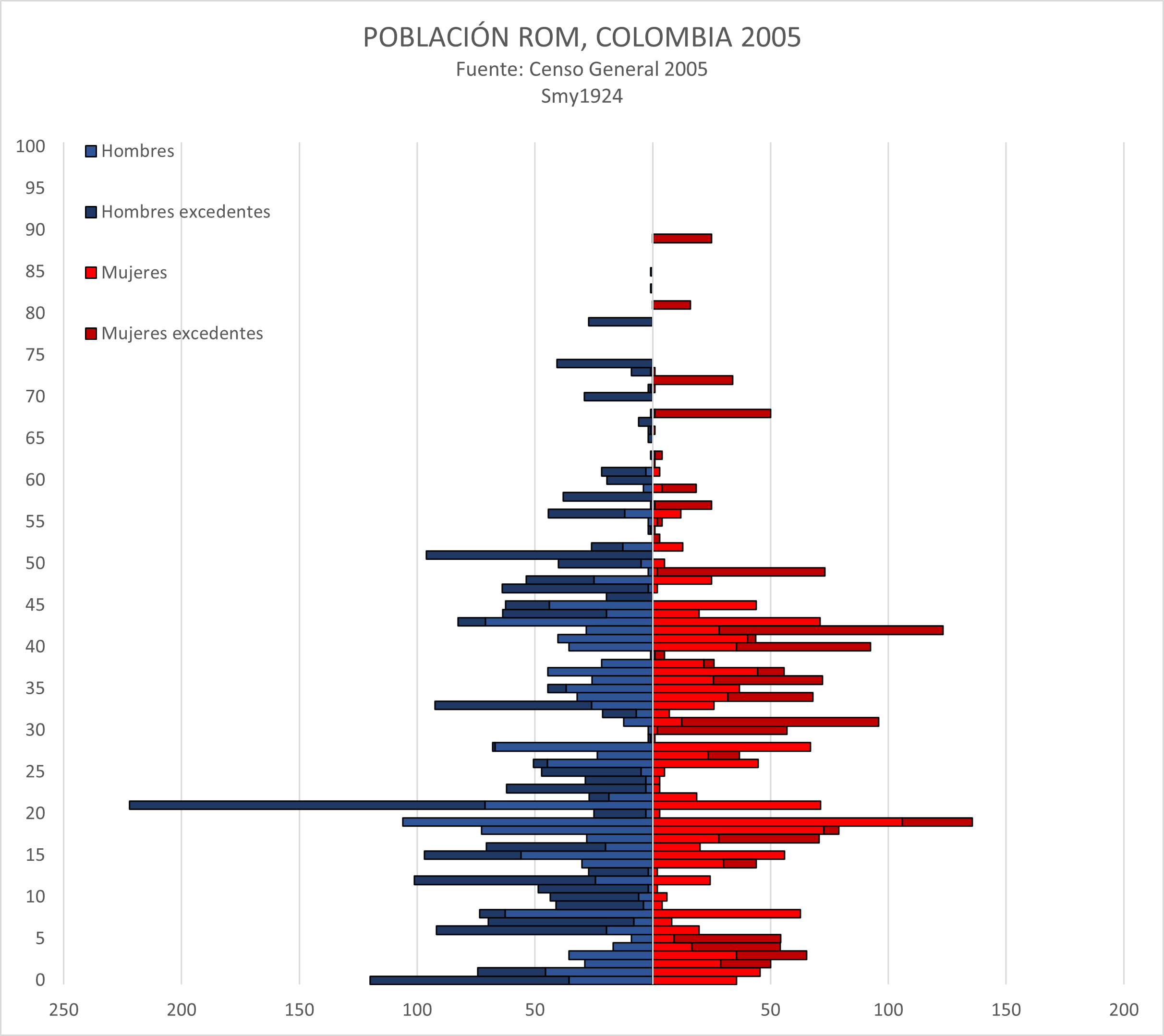
Rromani 2005.

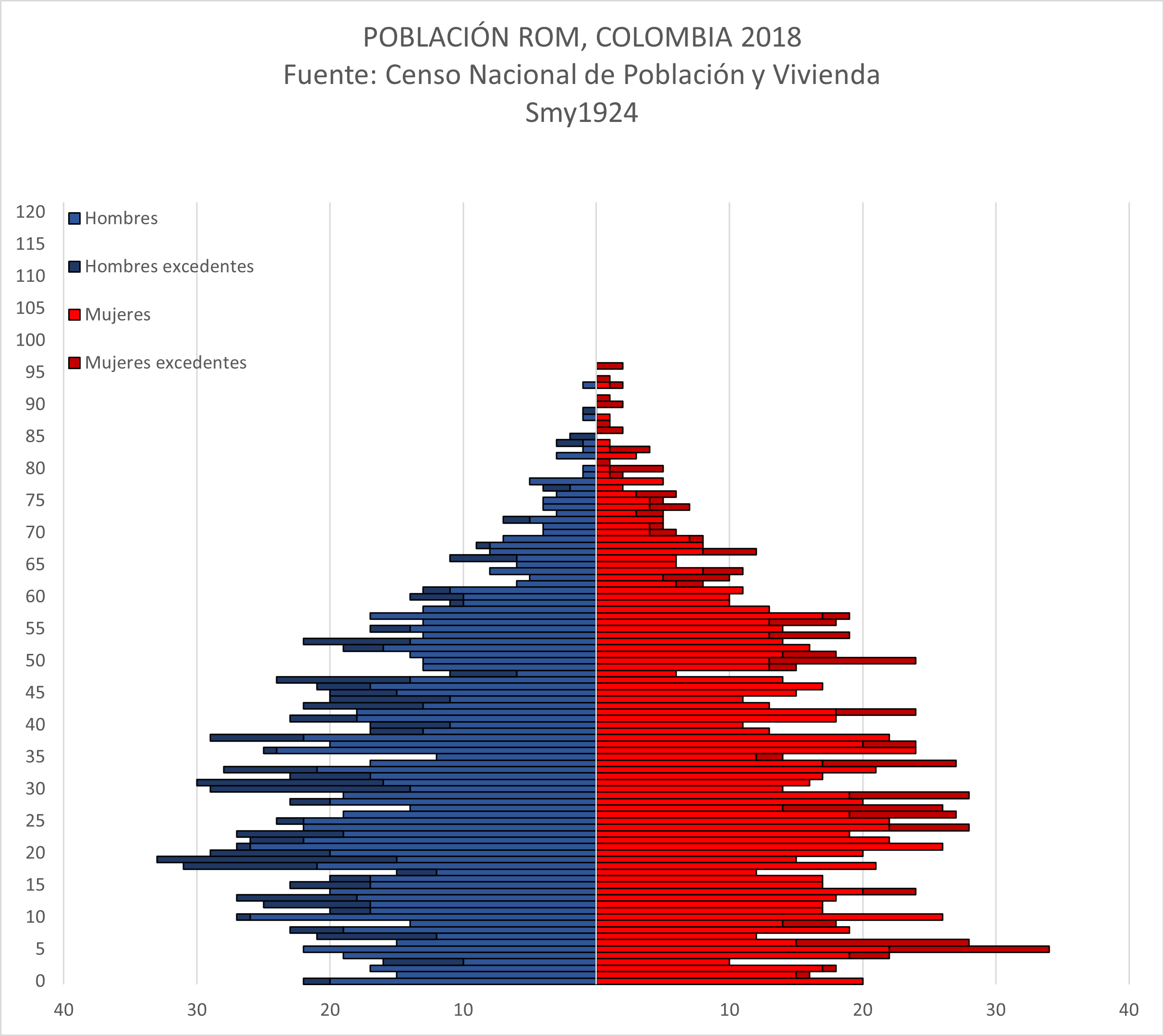
Rromani 2018.

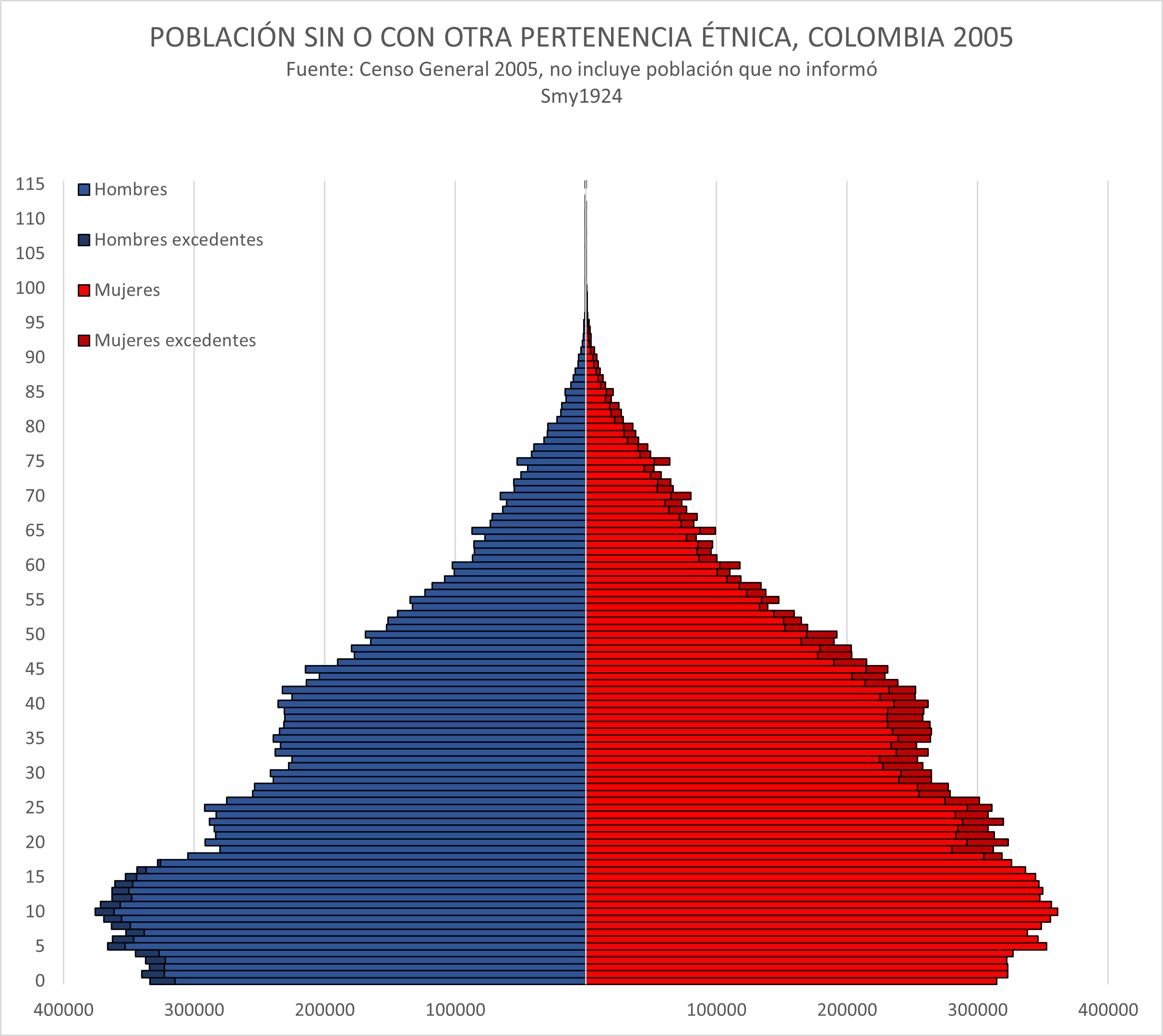
No or another ethnic-racial group, 2005.

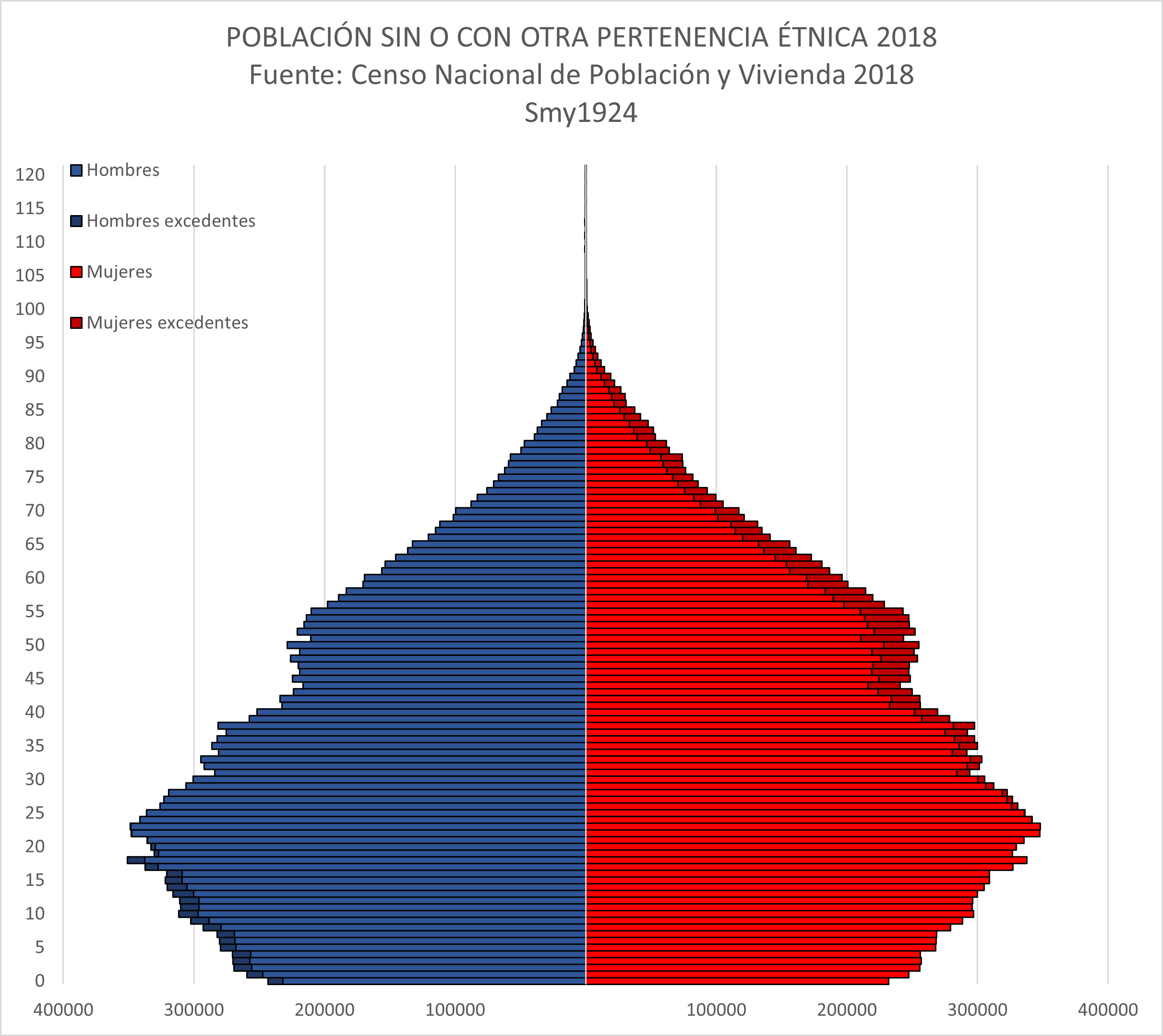
No or another ethnic-racial group, 2018.

== Languages ==
Spanish (of which Colombia has the third-largest population of speakers in the world after Mexico and the United States) is the official language, with 99.2% of Colombians speaking Spanish, and there are small communities in urban areas speaking other European languages such as German, French, English, Italian, and Portuguese. There are 65 indigenous languages and two Creole languages, one Creole in San Basilio de Palenque and one in San Andrés; and also San Andrés is the only place of Colombia where there are three official languages: Spanish, English and a creole language.

== Religion ==
Religion in Colombia (2014) – Pew Research Center
1. Catholicism (79.0%)
2. Protestantism (13.0%)
3. Unaffiliated (6.00%)
4. Other (2.00%)
Religion in Colombia – Other studies
1. Catholicism (70.9%)
2. Protestantism (16.7%)
3. Atheist or agnostic (4.70%)
4. Claim to believe in God but do not follow a specific religion (3.50%)
5. Jehovah's Witnesses and Adventism (1.80%)
6. Other (0.20%)
7. The remaining people either did not respond or replied that they did not know. (2.20%)

The National Administrative Department of Statistics (DANE) does not collect religious statistics, and accurate reports are difficult to obtain. However, based on various studies and a survey, about 90% of the population adheres to Christianity, the majority of which (70.9%) are Roman Catholic, while a significant minority (16.7%) adhere to Protestantism (primarily Evangelicalism). Some 4.7% of the population is atheist or agnostic, while 3.5% claim to believe in God but do not follow a specific religion. 1.8% of Colombians adhere to Jehovah's Witnesses and Adventism and less than 1% adhere to other religions, such as Islam, Judaism, Buddhism, Mormonism, Hinduism, Hare Krishna movement, Rastafari movement, Eastern Orthodox Church, and spiritual studies. The remaining people either did not respond or replied that they did not know. In addition to the above statistics, 35.9% of Colombians reported that they did not practice their faith actively. 1,519,562 people in Colombia, or around 3% of the population reported following an indigenous religion.

While Colombia remains a mostly Roman Catholic country by baptism numbers, the 1991 Colombian constitution guarantees freedom of religion and all religious faiths and churches are equally free before the law.

== Migration ==
=== Immigration ===
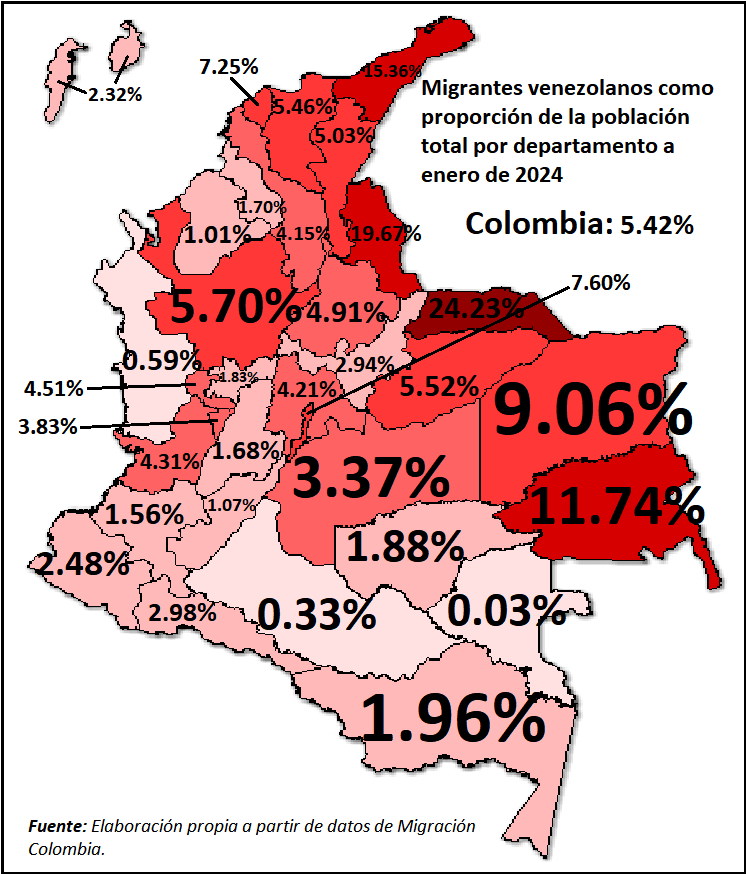
Venezuelans as a proportion of total population in departments of Colombia in January 2024

Due to the political situation in Venezuela many of its residents left the country. At the 2018 census, almost 3 million Venezuelans lived in Colombia. They mainly live in the provinces along the border of Venezuela.

Foreign-born population 2018 census
Country of birth	2018	
Country of birth	Number	%
Venezuela	2,837,900	86.96%
USA	150,124	2.09%
Ecuador	58,111	1.88%
Spain	44,954	1.55%
Peru	5,481	0.57%
Argentina	5,220	0.54%
Mexico	5,088	0.53%
Brazil	4,218	0.44%
Chile	4,182	0.43%
Italy	3,104	0.32%
France	2,954	0.31%
Panama	2,909	0.30%
Cuba	2,383	0.25%
Germany	2,133	0.22%
Costa Rica	1,675	0.17%
United Kingdom	1,591	0.17%
Canada	1,570	0.16%

Population pyramid by nationality as of July 2026

=== Emigration ===
Historically, a sizable percentage of Colombian emigration has also been motivated by the need to escape from political persecution and bipartisan violence during the periods of "La Violencia" (1948–1958), and later due to the effects of the nation's current conflict (since 1964). This has resulted in numerous applications for political asylum abroad.

Colombians have emigrated in comparably high rates to the United States. Other Colombians migrated to Canada and Europe (most to Spain, but also to France, Italy, the United Kingdom and Sweden). Among other locations.

Colombian population living abroad
Country of residency	2020	
Country of residency	Number	%
USA	1,557,000	40.91%
Venezuela	1,000,000	28.31%
Spain	481,000	8.75%
Ecuador	279,000	5.07%
Mexico	198,500	3.61%
Chile	135,000	2.45%
Canada	86,000	1.56%
Panama	58,350	1.07%
Argentina	50,000	0.91%
United Kingdom	48,000	0.87%
Brazil	43,500	0.79%
Peru	40,500	0.73%
Costa Rica	40,000	0.72%
France	40,000	0.72%
Germany	24,000	0.44%
Australia	22,000	0.40%
Italy	20,000	0.36%
Netherlands	18,000	0.33%
Sweden	15,000	0.27%
Bolivia	13,000	0.24%
Switzerland	12,000	0.22%
Aruba	8,000	0.15%
Dominican Republic	8,000	0.15%
Curacao	4,500	0.08%
China	4,000	0.07%
Norway	4,000	0.07%
Belgium	3,500	0.06%
Israel	3,500	0.06%
Japan	3,000	0.05%
UAE	2,500	0.04%
New Zealand	2,500	0.04%
Portugal	2,500	0.04%
Austria	2,000	0.03%
Cuba	2,000	0.03%
Russia	2,000	0.03%
Uruguay	2,000	0.03%
Guatemala	1,500	0.02%
Paraguay	1,500	0.02%
Honduras	1,300	0.02%
Nicaragua	1,200	0.02%
Lebanon	1,000	0.01%
Turkey	1,000	0.01%
