= Francisco Zumaqué =

Colombian musician

- Born: Francisco Zumaqué Gómez; 18 July 1945 (age 81); Cereté, Córdoba, Colombia
- Genres: Electroacoustic music
- Occupations: Composer, Independent Music Professional

Francisco Zumaqué Gómez (born 18 July 1945) is a Colombian musician and composer of rich Colombo-Caribbean rhythms. Defined as a contemporary musician with great part of his compositions oriented to Electroacoustic music, doing important research that contributed in the creation of new rhythms mixing traditional Colombian music with orchestral compositions. His music is considered avant-garde and refreshing, bright, flexible and with a personal worrisome of his cultural mark, all of these are reflected in several compositions that were a hit and are part of Colombian musical history. His compositions include symphonies, chamber music, vocals and works for non-conventional musical groups.

The single "Colombia Caribe" received significant airplay and led to increased visibility for the artist across several Latin American countries.

== Early start ==
At the age of 9 he formed his own musical group and 3 years later started composing music for his father's porro band "Banda Departamental de Córdoba". He toured with his father most of the northern Colombian coast where he got highly influenced by the musicians of the time (i.e. Pérez Prado, Pastor López and others)

== Musical style ==
Zumaqué defines himself as a musician with popular peasant roots of the savannahs of Córdoba Department, his home region. Grew up listening to porro bands and traditional pipers from Cereté and San Pelayo, vallenato groups such as Alejo Durán's and compositions and arrangements of his father Francisco Zumaqué, who was director of the Banda Departmental de Córdoba and popular orchestra Los Macumberos del Sinú.

In this context, he began his musical education with piano lessons, guitar and music theory with Tiburcio Romero. His early compositions and arrangements written for the orchestra of his father, were inspired by the music performed by Damaso Perez Prado, Stan Kenton and Juan Garcia Esquivel, who he listened incessantly on radio programs from Cuban, Mexican and American radio stations. His initial knowledge was supplemented at the Universidad de Antioquia in Medellín, between 1958 and 1962. There he received piano lessons from teacher Gómez Arriola, Harmony lessons with Mario Gómez-Vignes, and participated in the child and youth orchestra "Di Lido", created and directed by saxophonist Justo Almario.

== Education ==
After a short stay in Cartagena between 1963 and 1964, where he began a career in engineering, he decided to travel to Bogotá to enroll the Conservatory of Music at the Universidad Nacional de Colombia. He studied Harmony with Antonio Benavides, Counterpoint and Fugue with Fabio González Zuleta, Direction and Implementation of musical bands with José Rozo Contreras, and Conducting and Orchestration with Olav Roots. Very soon he began writing academic compositions and, encouraged by his fellow students, delved into the use of atonal languages. Simultaneously he began composing and conducting music for television and radio, and also joined as Artistic Director for CBS Records (later Sony Music) for which he made several musical arrangements of Colombian popular music with innovative instrumental formats.

In 1970 he graduated from the Universidad Nacional with a degree as Composer and Orchestra Conductor. Thanks to his academic performance he received the scholarship "Best Student of Fine Arts", that allowed him to continue his advanced studies in France. The following year he joined the American Conservatory in Paris where he studied with Nadia Boulanger (musical notation), Annette Dieudonné (auditory training) and Michel Philippot (composition). He also participated in the renowned Electroacoustic music courses of Pierre Schaeffer and Guy Reibel in the Groupe de Recherches Musicales (GRM) in Paris. He studied conducting with Igor Markevich and attended the composition class of Olivier Messiaen from whom he adopted his innovative ideas about treatment and development of rhythmic material.

His contact with contemporary trends of music played a role in his valuation for traditional musical forms and popular practice. In the first encounter with Nadia Boulanger presented works of abstract type with a highly developed language, but only managed to really capture her attention when he played in several piano pieces he had composed especially for a Colombian telenovela. The music included songs from the Chocó department in accordance with the cultural context framed by the telenovela. After listening these compositions, Boulanger prompted him to inquire himself about searching his own and original language.

== Career path ==
After completing his studies in Paris, Zumaqué followed a varied career path. He worked as professor of composition at the Conservatory of the Universidad Nacional in 1976, and as researcher at the CENIDIM at the Institute of Fine Arts in Mexico in 1980. He was also a composer and arranger for "Fania All Stars", Cheo Feliciano, and Eddie Palmieri between 1979 and 1981. With Macumbia, released in 1984, he managed to crystallize a precursor production in a style that combines jazz, pop and traditional Colombian music. Another example of his eclectic and flexible position as a composer is "Colombia Caribe", a piece that became the anthem of the Caribbean Music Festival (Festival de Música Caribe de Cartagena) in 1985 and is one of his most publicized creations. Similar works have been presented in various scenarios in the company of other musicians such as Totó La Momposina and Eddy Martinez with whom he produced the show "Colombia Suena Bien", which took place at the Teatro Colón in Bogotá in 1997.

He has occasionally returned to composing music for television and film. In 1976 he wrote the music for the show La Mala Hora, based on the literary work of Gabriel García Márquez, and in 1999 was in charge of the soundtrack to the restored silent film Bajo el Cielo de Antioquia, of Arturo Acevedo, originally released in 1924.

His musical activity has been complemented and enriched by attending meetings, forums, festivals, conferences and other events. Also his work and creations have received recognition and awards.

In recent years efforts have focused workshop on the draft of Utopias. According to the composer, it is a program of exploration and promotion of traditional Colombian music. Several of his recent works are directly related to this project, including the sacred cantata Cienaga de Oro, based on traditional religious musical elements of the Córdoba Department; his work Bacatá Zapqua written for the celebration of 459 years of the Colombian capital; Manglares (for soprano and tenor, two singers and ensemble river marimbas) and Rito de Manglares (ballet symphonic orchestra, choir and soloists, singers), both released in Cali at the International Art Festival.

== Compositions ==
- Baila Caribe Baila—CD, Francisco Zumaqué. Tropical music Afromanía Caribe, CD, 1991
- Ciénaga de Oro—CD, Francisco Zumaqué. Zumaqué Music, 2001
- Colombia Caribe—LP, Festival de Música del Caribe, Cartagena, 1985
- Cumbialma—CD, Francisco Zumaqué. Solidarte, 1998
- Cumbialma—CD, Francisco Zumaqué. Tropical Music, 1998
- Dale Colombia Dale—LP, E. Zumaqué. FM Discos, 1990
- Dúo Contemporáneo de Holanda—Henrry Bok y Ever Lemair, Fondo Cultural Cafetero, 1988
- El canto libre—LP, Los Machucambos. Daro, 1974
- El canto libre—LP, Los Machucambos. Discomoda, 1981
- Fantasía Caribe—CD, Francisco Zumaqué y la Banda Sinfónica Nacional de Colombia. Ministerio de Cultura, 1998
- Fascinación Caribe—CD, Orquesta Fascinación Caribe. Zumaqué Music, 2000
- Fascinación Caribe—CD, Orquesta Fascinación Caribe. Fonocaribe, 2001
- Francisco Zumaqué—LP, Francisco Zumaqué. Daro, 1978
- Francisco Zumaqué—LP, Grupos de la orquesta Filarmónica de Bogotá. Daro, 1988
- Génesis—Clásicos Colombianos S XX, vol. III, CD, Orquesta Sinfónica de Colombia, Colcultura, 1993
- Homenaje a José Barros—LP, Orquesta Filarmónica de Bogotá. Discos Orbe, 1983
- Homenaje a Lucho Bermúdez—LP, Orquesta Filarmónica de Bogotá. Discos Orbe, 1985
- Juana Inés—CD, Coro Infantil y Juvenil de Colombia, Ministerio de Cultura, 1998
- La Búsqueda—Dir.: Francisco Zumaqué, RCA Records, 1982
- Macumbia—LP, Grupo Macumbia, Dir: Francisco Zumaqué. Fonosema Discos, 1985
- Mi canción de Juventud—Francisco Zumaqué, LP, Coldeportes, 1984
- Misa Sacerdotalis—LP, Caja Vocacional, 1977
- Música de cámara para vientos y percusión - LP, Philips, 1989
- Onomá, Eleguá—Conciertos Colombianos vol. 1, CD, Ministerio de Cultura, 1998
- Páginas de mujer—Eddie Palmieri, CD, Música Latina Intl., 1981
- Rituales—CD, Francisco Zumaqué. Tropical music, 1994
- Sinú Dúo contemporáneo de Holanda, vol. 2, CD, Convenio Andrés Bello, 1996
- Son de mi Gente—CD, Francisco Zumaqué, Orquidea Records International, 1995
- Voces Caribes—CD, Francisco Zumaqué y Super Macumbia. Tropical music, 1993
- Zumaqué Caribe—LP, Francisco Zumaqué. Discos Fuentes, 1986
- Zumaqué Caribe—CD, Francisco Zumaqué. Discos Fuentes, 1992

== See also ==
- Music of Colombia
