= Cereté =

- Municipality and town
- Flag Coat of arms

- Location of the municipality and town of Cereté in the Department of Cordoba

- Location within Colombia
- Coordinates: 8°53′N 75°47′W
- Country: Colombia
- Department: Cordoba
- Founded: 1740
- Incorporated: 1923

Government
  - Type: Municipality
  - Mayor: Pugsly "El Tumor" Kubrik

Area
  - Municipality and town: 290.8 km^{2} (112.3 sq mi)
  - Urban: 19.33 km^{2} (7.46 sq mi)
- Elevation: 12 m (39 ft)

Population (2020 est.)
  - Municipality and town: 108,409
  - Density: 372.8/km^{2} (965.5/sq mi)
  - Urban: 60,220
  - Urban density: 3,115/km^{2} (8,069/sq mi)
- Demonym: Cereteano
- Area code: 57 + 4
- Website: Official site

Cereté is a town and municipality located in the Córdoba Department, northern Colombia. According to 2020 estimates, the population of Cereté town and municipality was 108,409.

== Name origin ==
Cereté comes from the two indigenous words meaning Chere (fish) and te (shelter).

== History ==
Cereté is one of the oldest administrative divisions in the Sinú Region, founded in 1721 by Spanish Francisco Velásquez and Cristóbal Jiménez de León. In 1731 the curate of Cereté-Mocarí was given to jesuits who were in the process of evangelizing local indigenous peoples. The settlement of Cereté was not officially established until 1740 when Juan de Torrezal Díaz Pimienta reorganized the settlement into a village.

== Geography and climate ==
The municipality of Cereté borders to the north with the municipality of San Pelayo, the municipalities of Ciénaga de Oro and San Carlos to the east, the municipalities of San Carlos and Montería to the south and to the west again with the municipalities of San Pelayo and Montería covering a total area of 351.8 km^{2}. Cereté has a yearly average temperature of 28 °C and is some 12 m over sea level. The town of Cereté is located some 18 km from the Cordoba Department capital Montería.

The town of Cereté is crossed by the Caño Bugre (Bugre Stream) an affluent of the Sinú River. The Bugre stream was once navigable and connected the town with other river towns like Puerto Wilches and San Pelayo.

Climate data for Cereté (Turipana), elevation 20 m (66 ft), (1981–2010)
Month	Jan	Feb	Mar	Apr	May	Jun	Jul	Aug	Sep	Oct	Nov	Dec	Year
Mean daily maximum °C (°F)	33.4 (92.1)	33.9 (93.0)	34.1 (93.4)	33.6 (92.5)	32.7 (90.9)	32.3 (90.1)	32.5 (90.5)	32.6 (90.7)	32.1 (89.8)	31.9 (89.4)	32.1 (89.8)	32.5 (90.5)	32.8 (91.0)
Daily mean °C (°F)	27.6 (81.7)	27.9 (82.2)	28.3 (82.9)	28.4 (83.1)	28.1 (82.6)	27.9 (82.2)	28.0 (82.4)	27.8 (82.0)	27.4 (81.3)	27.3 (81.1)	27.3 (81.1)	27.4 (81.3)	27.8 (82.0)
Mean daily minimum °C (°F)	22.3 (72.1)	22.6 (72.7)	23.2 (73.8)	23.9 (75.0)	24.0 (75.2)	23.7 (74.7)	23.5 (74.3)	23.5 (74.3)	23.3 (73.9)	23.4 (74.1)	23.2 (73.8)	22.9 (73.2)	23.3 (73.9)
Average precipitation mm (inches)	88.1 (3.47)	84.5 (3.33)	98.6 (3.88)	85.2 (3.35)	104.9 (4.13)	139.7 (5.50)	83.9 (3.30)	115.8 (4.56)	125.2 (4.93)	83.6 (3.29)	134.9 (5.31)	143.2 (5.64)	1,287.5 (50.69)
Average precipitation days	1	1	3	10	15	15	16	16	15	14	10	5	117
Average relative humidity (%)	79	78	76	78	83	83	83	83	84	84	84	82	81
Mean monthly sunshine hours	229.4	183.5	158.1	126.0	127.1	141.0	167.4	161.2	135.0	145.7	159.0	189.1	1,922.5
Mean daily sunshine hours	7.4	6.5	5.1	4.2	4.1	4.7	5.4	5.2	4.5	4.7	5.3	6.1	5.3
Source: Instituto de Hidrologia Meteorologia y Estudios Ambientales

== Economy ==
The economy of Cereté is based primarily in cattle raising with some 270 km^{2} used and agriculture with extensive cultivations of cotton (colloquially known as the "white gold") and sorghum covering an area of 80 km^{2}.
