= San Carlos, Córdoba =

Coordinates: 8.80056°N 75.7022°W

- Municipality and town
- Flag Coat of arms

- Location of the municipality and town of San Carlos, Córdoba in the Córdoba Department of Colombia.
- Country: Colombia
- Department: Córdoba Department

Population (Census 2018)
  - Total: 23,532
- Time zone: UTC-5 (Colombia Standard Time)

San Carlos is a town and municipality located in the Córdoba Department, northern Colombia. According to 2018 estimates, the population of San Carlos was 23,532.
