= San Pelayo, Córdoba =

Coordinates: 8°58′N 75°51′W

San Pelayo
- Municipality and town
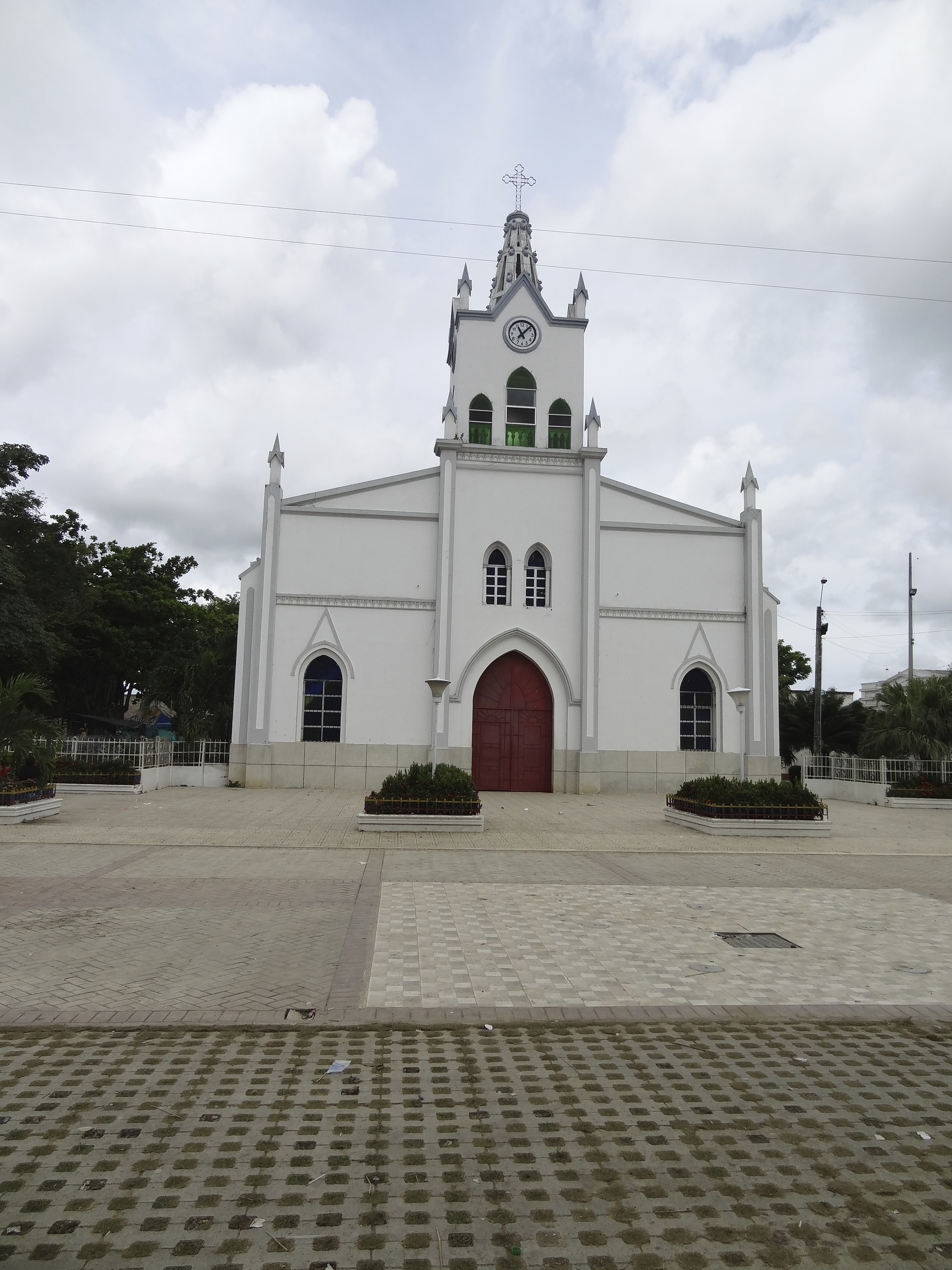

- Flag

- Location of the municipality and town of San Pelayo in the Córdoba Department of Colombia.
- Country: Colombia
- Department: Córdoba

Population (2020 est.)
  - Total: 45,816
- Time zone: UTC-5 (Colombia Standard Time)

San Pelayo is a town and municipality located in the Córdoba Department, northern Colombia. According to 2020 estimates, the population of San Pelayo was 45,816.

== See also ==
- San Pelayo, Gandara, Samar, Philippines
